This is a partial list of unnumbered minor planets for principal provisional designations assigned between 16 February and 15 March 2004. , a total of 518 bodies remain unnumbered for this period. Objects for this year are listed on the following pages: A–B · C · D–E · F · G–H · J–O · P–Q · Ri · Rii · Riii · S · Ti · Tii · Tiii · Tiv · U–V · W–X and Y. Also see previous and next year.

D 

|- id="2004 DB" bgcolor=#FA8072
| – || 2004 DB || MCA || 20.1 || data-sort-value="0.28" | 280 m || single || 4 days || 18 Feb 2004 || 57 || align=left | Disc.: SSS || 
|- id="2004 DX" bgcolor=#fefefe
| – || 2004 DX || MBA-I || 17.8 || data-sort-value="0.82" | 820 m || single || 3 days || 19 Feb 2004 || 14 || align=left | Disc.: LINEAR || 
|- id="2004 DH1" bgcolor=#E9E9E9
| 2 ||  || MBA-M || 18.1 || data-sort-value="0.71" | 710 m || multiple || 2004–2021 || 11 Jun 2021 || 38 || align=left | Disc.: Calar Alto Obs.Added on 17 June 2021 || 
|- id="2004 DK1" bgcolor=#FFC2E0
| 0 ||  || AMO || 21.30 || data-sort-value="0.20" | 200 m || multiple || 2004–2021 || 14 Aug 2021 || 540 || align=left | Disc.: LINEAR || 
|- id="2004 DL1" bgcolor=#FFC2E0
| 9 ||  || APO || 24.4 || data-sort-value="0.047" | 47 m || single || 4 days || 22 Feb 2004 || 14 || align=left | Disc.: Spacewatch || 
|- id="2004 DW1" bgcolor=#d6d6d6
| 0 ||  || MBA-O || 16.28 || 3.1 km || multiple || 2004–2021 || 21 Apr 2021 || 161 || align=left | Disc.: Altschwendt Obs.Alt.: 2015 CG20 || 
|- id="2004 DX1" bgcolor=#FA8072
| 0 ||  || HUN || 18.4 || data-sort-value="0.62" | 620 m || multiple || 2000–2019 || 31 Dec 2019 || 129 || align=left | Disc.: Tenagra II Obs. || 
|- id="2004 DF2" bgcolor=#FFC2E0
| 8 ||  || APO || 26.1 || data-sort-value="0.021" | 21 m || single || 3 days || 22 Feb 2004 || 19 || align=left | Disc.: LINEAR || 
|- id="2004 DM2" bgcolor=#E9E9E9
| 2 ||  || MBA-M || 18.2 || data-sort-value="0.68" | 680 m || multiple || 2004–2021 || 09 May 2021 || 40 || align=left | Disc.: SpacewatchAdded on 17 January 2021 || 
|- id="2004 DX2" bgcolor=#fefefe
| – ||  || MBA-I || 19.5 || data-sort-value="0.37" | 370 m || single || 6 days || 22 Feb 2004 || 12 || align=left | Disc.: LPL/Spacewatch II || 
|- id="2004 DH7" bgcolor=#E9E9E9
| 0 ||  || MBA-M || 17.1 || 2.1 km || multiple || 2004–2020 || 16 Oct 2020 || 116 || align=left | Disc.: LPL/Spacewatch IIAlt.: 2011 SG214, 2014 HH193, 2015 MF104, 2016 TK85 || 
|- id="2004 DX7" bgcolor=#d6d6d6
| 0 ||  || MBA-O || 16.8 || 2.4 km || multiple || 1999–2021 || 11 Jun 2021 || 156 || align=left | Disc.: SpacewatchAlt.: 2007 VN360 || 
|- id="2004 DZ7" bgcolor=#E9E9E9
| 0 ||  || MBA-M || 17.9 || 1.1 km || multiple || 2004–2021 || 07 Jan 2021 || 72 || align=left | Disc.: Spacewatch || 
|- id="2004 DE8" bgcolor=#d6d6d6
| 0 ||  || MBA-O || 16.96 || 2.3 km || multiple || 2004–2021 || 01 May 2021 || 77 || align=left | Disc.: Spacewatch || 
|- id="2004 DJ8" bgcolor=#fefefe
| 1 ||  || MBA-I || 18.8 || data-sort-value="0.52" | 520 m || multiple || 2004–2015 || 14 Apr 2015 || 27 || align=left | Disc.: Spacewatch || 
|- id="2004 DP8" bgcolor=#fefefe
| 0 ||  || MBA-I || 18.72 || data-sort-value="0.54" | 540 m || multiple || 2004–2021 || 07 Nov 2021 || 42 || align=left | Disc.: Spacewatch || 
|- id="2004 DO9" bgcolor=#E9E9E9
| 0 ||  || MBA-M || 17.24 || 1.5 km || multiple || 2004–2021 || 15 May 2021 || 205 || align=left | Disc.: LINEAR || 
|- id="2004 DU9" bgcolor=#E9E9E9
| 0 ||  || MBA-M || 18.12 || 1.0 km || multiple || 2004–2021 || 18 Apr 2021 || 80 || align=left | Disc.: Spacewatch || 
|- id="2004 DP16" bgcolor=#d6d6d6
| 0 ||  || MBA-O || 16.7 || 2.5 km || multiple || 1993–2020 || 23 Mar 2020 || 103 || align=left | Disc.: SpacewatchAlt.: 2015 BE36 || 
|- id="2004 DS16" bgcolor=#d6d6d6
| 0 ||  || MBA-O || 15.73 || 4.0 km || multiple || 1995–2021 || 11 May 2021 || 228 || align=left | Disc.: SpacewatchAlt.: 2010 MV38, 2016 GC220 || 
|- id="2004 DU17" bgcolor=#d6d6d6
| 0 ||  || MBA-O || 16.1 || 3.4 km || multiple || 2004–2020 || 02 Feb 2020 || 92 || align=left | Disc.: SpacewatchAlt.: 2007 TT208, 2010 BZ44 || 
|- id="2004 DS21" bgcolor=#fefefe
| 0 ||  || MBA-I || 17.59 || data-sort-value="0.90" | 900 m || multiple || 2004–2021 || 06 Apr 2021 || 148 || align=left | Disc.: SSS || 
|- id="2004 DS23" bgcolor=#E9E9E9
| 0 ||  || MBA-M || 17.52 || 1.3 km || multiple || 2004–2021 || 16 Apr 2021 || 123 || align=left | Disc.: LINEARAlt.: 2015 XE163 || 
|- id="2004 DZ23" bgcolor=#fefefe
| 0 ||  || HUN || 18.50 || data-sort-value="0.59" | 590 m || multiple || 2004–2021 || 09 Sep 2021 || 81 || align=left | Disc.: LINEAR || 
|- id="2004 DZ24" bgcolor=#fefefe
| 0 ||  || HUN || 18.47 || data-sort-value="0.60" | 600 m || multiple || 2004–2021 || 09 Jul 2021 || 79 || align=left | Disc.: Spacewatch || 
|- id="2004 DG25" bgcolor=#E9E9E9
| 0 ||  || MBA-M || 18.17 || data-sort-value="0.98" | 980 m || multiple || 2004–2021 || 10 May 2021 || 126 || align=left | Disc.: LINEAR || 
|- id="2004 DW27" bgcolor=#d6d6d6
| 0 ||  || MBA-O || 16.61 || 2.7 km || multiple || 2003–2021 || 13 Apr 2021 || 156 || align=left | Disc.: Spacewatch || 
|- id="2004 DT28" bgcolor=#d6d6d6
| 0 ||  || MBA-O || 16.50 || 2.8 km || multiple || 2004–2021 || 26 Aug 2021 || 132 || align=left | Disc.: SpacewatchAlt.: 2015 GZ6 || 
|- id="2004 DG29" bgcolor=#E9E9E9
| 0 ||  || MBA-M || 17.57 || data-sort-value="0.91" | 910 m || multiple || 2002–2021 || 07 Jul 2021 || 109 || align=left | Disc.: Spacewatch || 
|- id="2004 DQ29" bgcolor=#E9E9E9
| 0 ||  || MBA-M || 17.43 || 1.8 km || multiple || 2004–2022 || 07 Jan 2022 || 63 || align=left | Disc.: Spacewatch || 
|- id="2004 DA30" bgcolor=#d6d6d6
| 2 ||  || MBA-O || 18.0 || 1.4 km || multiple || 2004–2020 || 11 May 2020 || 45 || align=left | Disc.: LINEAR || 
|- id="2004 DR32" bgcolor=#fefefe
| 0 ||  || MBA-I || 17.43 || data-sort-value="0.97" | 970 m || multiple || 1995–2021 || 13 May 2021 || 259 || align=left | Disc.: LINEAR || 
|- id="2004 DM34" bgcolor=#d6d6d6
| 0 ||  || MBA-O || 15.39 || 4.7 km || multiple || 2000–2021 || 01 Apr 2021 || 297 || align=left | Disc.: Kvistaberg Obs.Alt.: 2010 KB134, 2016 BT12 || 
|- id="2004 DM36" bgcolor=#E9E9E9
| 0 ||  || MBA-M || 17.46 || data-sort-value="0.96" | 960 m || multiple || 2000–2021 || 12 May 2021 || 133 || align=left | Disc.: LINEAR || 
|- id="2004 DZ43" bgcolor=#FA8072
| 4 ||  || MCA || 20.6 || data-sort-value="0.32" | 320 m || single || 51 days || 14 Apr 2004 || 43 || align=left | Disc.: LINEAR || 
|- id="2004 DM44" bgcolor=#FFC2E0
| 0 ||  || APO || 20.7 || data-sort-value="0.26" | 260 m || multiple || 2004–2007 || 08 Oct 2007 || 101 || align=left | Disc.: LINEARPotentially hazardous object || 
|- id="2004 DW52" bgcolor=#fefefe
| 0 ||  || MBA-I || 17.84 || data-sort-value="0.80" | 800 m || multiple || 1997–2021 || 07 Apr 2021 || 186 || align=left | Disc.: LINEARAlt.: 2015 MF61, 2016 TK54 || 
|- id="2004 DA53" bgcolor=#FFC2E0
| 8 ||  || ATE || 28.0 || data-sort-value="0.0089" | 9 m || single || 2 days || 27 Feb 2004 || 17 || align=left | Disc.: LINEAR || 
|- id="2004 DM53" bgcolor=#fefefe
| 1 ||  || MBA-I || 18.5 || data-sort-value="0.59" | 590 m || multiple || 2004–2019 || 25 Sep 2019 || 117 || align=left | Disc.: Berg. Gladbach || 
|- id="2004 DY53" bgcolor=#d6d6d6
| 0 ||  || MBA-O || 16.3 || 3.1 km || multiple || 2004–2021 || 14 May 2021 || 127 || align=left | Disc.: SpacewatchAlt.: 2010 GS159 || 
|- id="2004 DA54" bgcolor=#d6d6d6
| 1 ||  || MBA-O || 17.6 || 1.7 km || multiple || 2004–2020 || 26 Jan 2020 || 59 || align=left | Disc.: SpacewatchAlt.: 2015 BQ278 || 
|- id="2004 DD54" bgcolor=#fefefe
| 0 ||  || MBA-I || 17.4 || data-sort-value="0.98" | 980 m || multiple || 2004–2021 || 13 Jan 2021 || 110 || align=left | Disc.: Spacewatch || 
|- id="2004 DX54" bgcolor=#fefefe
| 0 ||  || MBA-I || 18.90 || data-sort-value="0.49" | 490 m || multiple || 2004–2022 || 26 Jan 2022 || 45 || align=left | Disc.: Spacewatch || 
|- id="2004 DE55" bgcolor=#d6d6d6
| 0 ||  || MBA-O || 17.18 || 2.0 km || multiple || 2004–2021 || 08 Sep 2021 || 118 || align=left | Disc.: SpacewatchAlt.: 2007 UW102 || 
|- id="2004 DL55" bgcolor=#E9E9E9
| 0 ||  || MBA-M || 17.64 || data-sort-value="0.88" | 880 m || multiple || 2004–2021 || 09 May 2021 || 81 || align=left | Disc.: Spacewatch || 
|- id="2004 DT55" bgcolor=#d6d6d6
| 0 ||  || MBA-O || 16.9 || 2.3 km || multiple || 2004–2020 || 27 Apr 2020 || 51 || align=left | Disc.: Spacewatch || 
|- id="2004 DY55" bgcolor=#fefefe
| 0 ||  || MBA-I || 17.6 || data-sort-value="0.90" | 900 m || multiple || 2004–2020 || 23 Mar 2020 || 134 || align=left | Disc.: SpacewatchAlt.: 2012 TG232 || 
|- id="2004 DZ55" bgcolor=#fefefe
| 0 ||  || MBA-I || 17.98 || data-sort-value="0.75" | 750 m || multiple || 2004–2022 || 26 Jan 2022 || 79 || align=left | Disc.: SpacewatchAlt.: 2011 BY87 || 
|- id="2004 DB57" bgcolor=#fefefe
| 0 ||  || MBA-I || 18.61 || data-sort-value="0.56" | 560 m || multiple || 1999–2021 || 11 May 2021 || 88 || align=left | Disc.: Spacewatch || 
|- id="2004 DM57" bgcolor=#fefefe
| 0 ||  || MBA-I || 17.59 || data-sort-value="0.90" | 900 m || multiple || 2003–2021 || 06 May 2021 || 236 || align=left | Disc.: LINEAR || 
|- id="2004 DN57" bgcolor=#d6d6d6
| 0 ||  || MBA-O || 16.54 || 4.2 km || multiple || 2004–2021 || 09 Apr 2021 || 148 || align=left | Disc.: LINEAR || 
|- id="2004 DB58" bgcolor=#d6d6d6
| 0 ||  || HIL || 15.63 || 4.2 km || multiple || 2004–2021 || 11 Jun 2021 || 136 || align=left | Disc.: LINEARAlt.: 2010 XJ76, 2012 DN90 || 
|- id="2004 DT58" bgcolor=#E9E9E9
| 0 ||  || MBA-M || 17.46 || 1.4 km || multiple || 2004–2021 || 14 Apr 2021 || 138 || align=left | Disc.: LINEARAlt.: 2015 UE70 || 
|- id="2004 DW58" bgcolor=#fefefe
| 1 ||  || MBA-I || 17.8 || data-sort-value="0.82" | 820 m || multiple || 2004–2021 || 18 Jan 2021 || 82 || align=left | Disc.: LINEARAlt.: 2011 EK86 || 
|- id="2004 DA61" bgcolor=#E9E9E9
| 0 ||  || MBA-M || 17.4 || data-sort-value="0.98" | 980 m || multiple || 2004–2021 || 01 Jun 2021 || 125 || align=left | Disc.: LINEAR || 
|- id="2004 DX61" bgcolor=#FA8072
| 0 ||  || MCA || 17.1 || 1.6 km || multiple || 2003–2017 || 01 Apr 2017 || 43 || align=left | Disc.: Spacewatch || 
|- id="2004 DA62" bgcolor=#C7FF8F
| 0 ||  || CEN || 13.0 || 15 km || multiple || 1983–2004 || 21 Jul 2004 || 149 || align=left | Disc.: LINEAR, BR-mag: 1.37 || 
|- id="2004 DQ63" bgcolor=#E9E9E9
| 0 ||  || MBA-M || 17.3 || 1.9 km || multiple || 2004–2019 || 24 Oct 2019 || 69 || align=left | Disc.: SpacewatchAlt.: 2013 CS86 || 
|- id="2004 DW63" bgcolor=#fefefe
| 0 ||  || MBA-I || 18.4 || data-sort-value="0.62" | 620 m || multiple || 2004–2021 || 18 Jan 2021 || 71 || align=left | Disc.: SpacewatchAlt.: 2011 GP38 || 
|- id="2004 DG64" bgcolor=#C2E0FF
| E ||  || TNO || 7.7 || 99 km || single || 22 days || 15 Mar 2004 || 7 || align=left | Disc.: Kitt Peak Obs.LoUTNOs, cubewano? || 
|- id="2004 DH64" bgcolor=#C2E0FF
| 2 ||  || TNO || 5.9 || 220 km || multiple || 2004–2021 || 15 Feb 2021 || 29 || align=left | Disc.: Kitt Peak Obs.LoUTNOs, cubewano (cold)Alt.: 2006 CQ79 || 
|- id="2004 DK64" bgcolor=#C2E0FF
| E ||  || TNO || 7.4 || 138 km || single || 19 days || 16 Mar 2004 || 5 || align=left | Disc.: Kitt Peak Obs.LoUTNOs, other TNO || 
|- id="2004 DL64" bgcolor=#C2E0FF
| E ||  || TNO || 7.0 || 137 km || single || 18 days || 15 Mar 2004 || 5 || align=left | Disc.: Kitt Peak Obs.LoUTNOs, cubewano? || 
|- id="2004 DM64" bgcolor=#C2E0FF
| 3 ||  || TNO || 7.0 || 132 km || multiple || 2004–2015 || 23 Mar 2015 || 16 || align=left | Disc.: Kitt Peak Obs.LoUTNOs, cubewano (cold) || 
|- id="2004 DN64" bgcolor=#C2E0FF
| E ||  || TNO || 7.6 || 100 km || single || 18 days || 15 Mar 2004 || 6 || align=left | Disc.: Kitt Peak Obs.LoUTNOs, cubewano (cold) || 
|- id="2004 DT64" bgcolor=#d6d6d6
| 0 ||  || MBA-O || 16.8 || 2.4 km || multiple || 2004–2021 || 01 Jun 2021 || 80 || align=left | Disc.: LPL/Spacewatch II || 
|- id="2004 DF65" bgcolor=#fefefe
| 0 ||  || MBA-I || 17.82 || data-sort-value="0.81" | 810 m || multiple || 2004–2021 || 26 Oct 2021 || 90 || align=left | Disc.: Kitt Peak Obs.Alt.: 2014 WC391 || 
|- id="2004 DO66" bgcolor=#d6d6d6
| 0 ||  || MBA-O || 16.0 || 3.5 km || multiple || 2004–2021 || 18 Jan 2021 || 100 || align=left | Disc.: Kitt Peak Obs. || 
|- id="2004 DQ66" bgcolor=#d6d6d6
| 0 ||  || MBA-O || 17.1 || 2.1 km || multiple || 2004–2021 || 18 Jan 2021 || 79 || align=left | Disc.: Kitt Peak Obs. || 
|- id="2004 DQ67" bgcolor=#d6d6d6
| 0 ||  || MBA-O || 16.86 || 2.4 km || multiple || 2004–2021 || 30 May 2021 || 75 || align=left | Disc.: Kitt Peak Obs. || 
|- id="2004 DT67" bgcolor=#E9E9E9
| 0 ||  || MBA-M || 17.5 || 1.3 km || multiple || 2004–2021 || 18 Jan 2021 || 94 || align=left | Disc.: Kitt Peak Obs.Alt.: 2005 JM165, 2014 QZ161 || 
|- id="2004 DB68" bgcolor=#E9E9E9
| 0 ||  || MBA-M || 18.03 || data-sort-value="0.74" | 740 m || multiple || 2004–2021 || 17 May 2021 || 86 || align=left | Disc.: Kitt Peak Obs. || 
|- id="2004 DG68" bgcolor=#E9E9E9
| 2 ||  || MBA-M || 18.1 || 1.3 km || multiple || 2004–2020 || 11 Oct 2020 || 29 || align=left | Disc.: Kitt Peak Obs.Added on 17 January 2021 || 
|- id="2004 DK68" bgcolor=#E9E9E9
| 0 ||  || MBA-M || 17.4 || 1.8 km || multiple || 2004–2020 || 18 Sep 2020 || 59 || align=left | Disc.: Kitt Peak Obs.Added on 17 January 2021 || 
|- id="2004 DO68" bgcolor=#E9E9E9
| 0 ||  || MBA-M || 17.2 || 1.5 km || multiple || 2004–2021 || 04 Jan 2021 || 93 || align=left | Disc.: Kitt Peak Obs.Alt.: 2015 TT210 || 
|- id="2004 DP68" bgcolor=#d6d6d6
| 1 ||  || MBA-O || 17.2 || 2.0 km || multiple || 2004–2021 || 07 Feb 2021 || 30 || align=left | Disc.: Kitt Peak Obs.Alt.: 2010 KO92 || 
|- id="2004 DQ68" bgcolor=#d6d6d6
| 0 ||  || MBA-O || 17.1 || 2.1 km || multiple || 2004–2019 || 03 Dec 2019 || 53 || align=left | Disc.: Kitt Peak Obs.Added on 22 July 2020Alt.: 2013 TJ59 || 
|- id="2004 DT68" bgcolor=#fefefe
| 0 ||  || MBA-I || 18.6 || data-sort-value="0.57" | 570 m || multiple || 2004–2021 || 17 Apr 2021 || 34 || align=left | Disc.: Kitt Peak Obs. || 
|- id="2004 DU68" bgcolor=#E9E9E9
| 0 ||  || MBA-M || 17.5 || 1.8 km || multiple || 2004–2020 || 11 Nov 2020 || 32 || align=left | Disc.: Kitt Peak Obs.Added on 17 January 2021 || 
|- id="2004 DX68" bgcolor=#fefefe
| 1 ||  || MBA-I || 18.4 || data-sort-value="0.62" | 620 m || multiple || 2004–2019 || 28 Dec 2019 || 57 || align=left | Disc.: Kitt Peak Obs. || 
|- id="2004 DZ68" bgcolor=#E9E9E9
| 0 ||  || MBA-M || 18.38 || data-sort-value="0.89" | 890 m || multiple || 2004–2020 || 11 Dec 2020 || 44 || align=left | Disc.: Kitt Peak Obs.Added on 17 January 2021 || 
|- id="2004 DA69" bgcolor=#fefefe
| 0 ||  || MBA-I || 17.9 || data-sort-value="0.78" | 780 m || multiple || 2002–2020 || 14 Nov 2020 || 148 || align=left | Disc.: Kitt Peak Obs. || 
|- id="2004 DK69" bgcolor=#d6d6d6
| 0 ||  || MBA-O || 17.2 || 2.0 km || multiple || 2004–2018 || 05 Oct 2018 || 45 || align=left | Disc.: Kitt Peak Obs.Alt.: 2015 BO384 || 
|- id="2004 DS69" bgcolor=#d6d6d6
| 0 ||  || MBA-O || 17.7 || 1.6 km || multiple || 2004–2021 || 08 Sep 2021 || 64 || align=left | Disc.: Kitt PeakAdded on 29 January 2022 || 
|- id="2004 DW69" bgcolor=#E9E9E9
| 0 ||  || MBA-M || 17.4 || 1.4 km || multiple || 2004–2018 || 10 Jul 2018 || 54 || align=left | Disc.: Kitt Peak Obs. || 
|- id="2004 DX69" bgcolor=#d6d6d6
| 1 ||  || HIL || 16.0 || 3.5 km || multiple || 2004–2021 || 07 Jun 2021 || 41 || align=left | Disc.: Kitt Peak Obs.Added on 17 January 2021 || 
|- id="2004 DB70" bgcolor=#d6d6d6
| 0 ||  || MBA-O || 17.6 || 1.7 km || multiple || 2004–2020 || 03 Jan 2020 || 78 || align=left | Disc.: Kitt Peak Obs.Alt.: 2015 BV67 || 
|- id="2004 DG70" bgcolor=#E9E9E9
| 0 ||  || MBA-M || 17.3 || 1.9 km || multiple || 2004–2020 || 22 Nov 2020 || 73 || align=left | Disc.: Kitt Peak Obs. || 
|- id="2004 DT70" bgcolor=#fefefe
| 1 ||  || MBA-I || 18.3 || data-sort-value="0.65" | 650 m || multiple || 2004–2020 || 22 Nov 2020 || 32 || align=left | Disc.: Kitt PeakAdded on 24 December 2021 || 
|- id="2004 DU70" bgcolor=#fefefe
| 0 ||  || MBA-I || 18.9 || data-sort-value="0.49" | 490 m || multiple || 1999–2020 || 01 Feb 2020 || 51 || align=left | Disc.: SpacewatchAlt.: 1999 VJ230 || 
|- id="2004 DX70" bgcolor=#d6d6d6
| 0 ||  || MBA-O || 17.6 || 1.7 km || multiple || 2004–2019 || 08 Feb 2019 || 46 || align=left | Disc.: Kitt Peak Obs. || 
|- id="2004 DK71" bgcolor=#C2E0FF
| E ||  || TNO || 7.3 || 119 km || single || 17 days || 15 Mar 2004 || 4 || align=left | Disc.: Kitt Peak Obs.LoUTNOs, cubewano? || 
|- id="2004 DL71" bgcolor=#C2E0FF
| E ||  || TNO || 7.1 || 130 km || single || 17 days || 15 Mar 2004 || 4 || align=left | Disc.: Kitt Peak Obs.LoUTNOs, cubewano? || 
|- id="2004 DM71" bgcolor=#C2E0FF
| 3 ||  || TNO || 7.4 || 110 km || multiple || 2004–2019 || 05 Apr 2019 || 13 || align=left | Disc.: Kitt Peak Obs.LoUTNOs, cubewano (cold) || 
|- id="2004 DZ71" bgcolor=#d6d6d6
| 0 ||  || MBA-O || 17.10 || 2.1 km || multiple || 2001–2021 || 11 May 2021 || 64 || align=left | Disc.: SpacewatchAdded on 11 May 2021Alt.: 2021 GB15 || 
|- id="2004 DP73" bgcolor=#d6d6d6
| 0 ||  || MBA-O || 17.1 || 2.1 km || multiple || 2004–2021 || 04 Apr 2021 || 43 || align=left | Disc.: SpacewatchAdded on 9 March 2021 || 
|- id="2004 DU73" bgcolor=#E9E9E9
| 0 ||  || MBA-M || 17.37 || 1.0 km || multiple || 2004–2021 || 15 May 2021 || 80 || align=left | Disc.: Spacewatch || 
|- id="2004 DK74" bgcolor=#fefefe
| 0 ||  || MBA-I || 17.79 || data-sort-value="0.82" | 820 m || multiple || 2002–2021 || 14 Apr 2021 || 140 || align=left | Disc.: SpacewatchAlt.: 2016 WM45 || 
|- id="2004 DT74" bgcolor=#E9E9E9
| 0 ||  || MBA-M || 17.6 || 1.3 km || multiple || 2004–2021 || 18 Jan 2021 || 64 || align=left | Disc.: Spacewatch || 
|- id="2004 DU74" bgcolor=#E9E9E9
| 0 ||  || MBA-M || 17.4 || 1.4 km || multiple || 2004–2021 || 18 Jan 2021 || 92 || align=left | Disc.: SpacewatchAlt.: 2017 FT7 || 
|- id="2004 DX74" bgcolor=#fefefe
| 2 ||  || MBA-I || 18.9 || data-sort-value="0.49" | 490 m || multiple || 2004–2019 || 19 Nov 2019 || 28 || align=left | Disc.: Spacewatch || 
|- id="2004 DB75" bgcolor=#d6d6d6
| 0 ||  || MBA-O || 16.66 || 2.6 km || multiple || 2004–2021 || 09 Apr 2021 || 97 || align=left | Disc.: SpacewatchAdded on 11 May 2021Alt.: 2010 MN15, 2015 BJ494 || 
|- id="2004 DC75" bgcolor=#E9E9E9
| 0 ||  || MBA-M || 16.9 || 1.8 km || multiple || 2004–2019 || 23 Sep 2019 || 237 || align=left | Disc.: SpacewatchAlt.: 2015 TR314 || 
|- id="2004 DL75" bgcolor=#fefefe
| 0 ||  || MBA-I || 18.67 || data-sort-value="0.55" | 550 m || multiple || 2001–2021 || 11 Jul 2021 || 104 || align=left | Disc.: SpacewatchAdded on 17 June 2021Alt.: 2012 TM156 || 
|- id="2004 DM75" bgcolor=#E9E9E9
| 0 ||  || MBA-M || 17.55 || data-sort-value="0.92" | 920 m || multiple || 2004–2021 || 30 Apr 2021 || 136 || align=left | Disc.: SpacewatchAlt.: 2008 CB13 || 
|- id="2004 DS75" bgcolor=#fefefe
| 0 ||  || MBA-I || 18.46 || data-sort-value="0.60" | 600 m || multiple || 2004–2021 || 15 Apr 2021 || 188 || align=left | Disc.: Spacewatch || 
|- id="2004 DH76" bgcolor=#d6d6d6
| 0 ||  || MBA-O || 17.09 || 2.1 km || multiple || 2004–2021 || 09 Apr 2021 || 42 || align=left | Disc.: LPL/Spacewatch IIAlt.: 2015 BU327 || 
|- id="2004 DL76" bgcolor=#fefefe
| 0 ||  || MBA-I || 18.3 || data-sort-value="0.65" | 650 m || multiple || 2004–2020 || 13 Sep 2020 || 40 || align=left | Disc.: Spacewatch || 
|- id="2004 DO76" bgcolor=#fefefe
| 2 ||  || MBA-I || 18.8 || data-sort-value="0.52" | 520 m || multiple || 2004–2017 || 17 Mar 2017 || 33 || align=left | Disc.: LPL/Spacewatch II || 
|- id="2004 DS76" bgcolor=#E9E9E9
| 0 ||  || MBA-M || 17.0 || 2.2 km || multiple || 2004–2020 || 14 Dec 2020 || 132 || align=left | Disc.: LPL/Spacewatch II || 
|- id="2004 DF77" bgcolor=#C2E0FF
| E ||  || TNO || 7.7 || 120 km || single || 17 days || 15 Mar 2004 || 4 || align=left | Disc.: Kitt Peak Obs.LoUTNOs, other TNO || 
|- id="2004 DG77" bgcolor=#C2E0FF
| 3 ||  || TNO || 7.3 || 144 km || multiple || 2004–2015 || 16 Mar 2015 || 11 || align=left | Disc.: Kitt Peak Obs.LoUTNOs, other TNO || 
|- id="2004 DE78" bgcolor=#d6d6d6
| 0 ||  || MBA-O || 17.0 || 2.2 km || multiple || 2004–2020 || 21 Apr 2020 || 55 || align=left | Disc.: LINEARAdded on 22 July 2020 || 
|- id="2004 DV78" bgcolor=#E9E9E9
| 0 ||  || MBA-M || 17.99 || 1.1 km || multiple || 2004–2021 || 06 Apr 2021 || 80 || align=left | Disc.: Tenagra II Obs.Alt.: 2015 XL273 || 
|- id="2004 DB79" bgcolor=#fefefe
| 2 ||  || MBA-I || 19.4 || data-sort-value="0.39" | 390 m || multiple || 2004–2020 || 15 Oct 2020 || 44 || align=left | Disc.: Calar Alto || 
|- id="2004 DC79" bgcolor=#d6d6d6
| 0 ||  || MBA-O || 15.8 || 3.9 km || multiple || 2004–2021 || 15 Jan 2021 || 113 || align=left | Disc.: Calar Alto || 
|- id="2004 DE79" bgcolor=#fefefe
| 0 ||  || MBA-I || 18.3 || data-sort-value="0.65" | 650 m || multiple || 2004–2020 || 21 Oct 2020 || 111 || align=left | Disc.: Calar Alto || 
|- id="2004 DN79" bgcolor=#fefefe
| 0 ||  || HUN || 18.29 || data-sort-value="0.65" | 650 m || multiple || 2004–2021 || 04 Dec 2021 || 137 || align=left | Disc.: SSS || 
|- id="2004 DE80" bgcolor=#fefefe
| 0 ||  || MBA-I || 18.03 || data-sort-value="0.74" | 740 m || multiple || 2004–2021 || 08 Sep 2021 || 109 || align=left | Disc.: LINEARAlt.: 2017 FW123 || 
|- id="2004 DN80" bgcolor=#E9E9E9
| 0 ||  || MBA-M || 17.7 || 1.6 km || multiple || 2004–2020 || 06 Dec 2020 || 65 || align=left | Disc.: LPL/Spacewatch IIAlt.: 2013 CR165 || 
|- id="2004 DO80" bgcolor=#fefefe
| 0 ||  || MBA-I || 18.52 || data-sort-value="0.59" | 590 m || multiple || 2004–2022 || 26 Jan 2022 || 149 || align=left | Disc.: SDSS || 
|- id="2004 DQ80" bgcolor=#d6d6d6
| 0 ||  || MBA-O || 16.07 || 3.4 km || multiple || 2004–2021 || 01 Jun 2021 || 145 || align=left | Disc.: SDSS || 
|- id="2004 DR80" bgcolor=#fefefe
| 0 ||  || MBA-I || 17.8 || data-sort-value="0.82" | 820 m || multiple || 2004–2020 || 11 Dec 2020 || 98 || align=left | Disc.: Spacewatch || 
|- id="2004 DT80" bgcolor=#fefefe
| 0 ||  || MBA-I || 17.8 || data-sort-value="0.82" | 820 m || multiple || 2004–2020 || 17 Dec 2020 || 127 || align=left | Disc.: Spacewatch || 
|- id="2004 DV80" bgcolor=#E9E9E9
| 0 ||  || MBA-M || 17.50 || 1.8 km || multiple || 2004–2021 || 30 Nov 2021 || 125 || align=left | Disc.: Spacewatch || 
|- id="2004 DW80" bgcolor=#fefefe
| 0 ||  || MBA-I || 18.1 || data-sort-value="0.71" | 710 m || multiple || 2004–2020 || 17 Nov 2020 || 81 || align=left | Disc.: Kitt Peak Obs. || 
|- id="2004 DY80" bgcolor=#fefefe
| 0 ||  || MBA-I || 17.6 || data-sort-value="0.90" | 900 m || multiple || 2004–2021 || 04 Jan 2021 || 109 || align=left | Disc.: Spacewatch || 
|- id="2004 DZ80" bgcolor=#d6d6d6
| 0 ||  || MBA-O || 16.39 || 2.9 km || multiple || 2004–2021 || 30 May 2021 || 119 || align=left | Disc.: Spacewatch || 
|- id="2004 DA81" bgcolor=#d6d6d6
| 0 ||  || MBA-O || 16.42 || 2.9 km || multiple || 2004–2021 || 09 Apr 2021 || 85 || align=left | Disc.: SDSS || 
|- id="2004 DB81" bgcolor=#d6d6d6
| 0 ||  || MBA-O || 17.01 || 2.2 km || multiple || 2004–2021 || 11 Jun 2021 || 79 || align=left | Disc.: Kitt Peak Obs. || 
|- id="2004 DC81" bgcolor=#fefefe
| 0 ||  || MBA-I || 18.11 || data-sort-value="0.71" | 710 m || multiple || 2004–2022 || 24 Jan 2022 || 80 || align=left | Disc.: Spacewatch || 
|- id="2004 DD81" bgcolor=#fefefe
| 0 ||  || MBA-I || 17.7 || data-sort-value="0.86" | 860 m || multiple || 2004–2021 || 12 Jan 2021 || 111 || align=left | Disc.: Spacewatch || 
|- id="2004 DH81" bgcolor=#d6d6d6
| 0 ||  || MBA-O || 17.07 || 2.1 km || multiple || 2004–2021 || 27 Nov 2021 || 113 || align=left | Disc.: LPL/Spacewatch II || 
|- id="2004 DJ81" bgcolor=#d6d6d6
| 0 ||  || MBA-O || 16.4 || 2.9 km || multiple || 2004–2021 || 16 Jan 2021 || 80 || align=left | Disc.: SDSS || 
|- id="2004 DK81" bgcolor=#E9E9E9
| 0 ||  || MBA-M || 17.28 || 1.9 km || multiple || 2004–2022 || 27 Jan 2022 || 95 || align=left | Disc.: Spacewatch || 
|- id="2004 DL81" bgcolor=#fefefe
| 0 ||  || MBA-I || 18.5 || data-sort-value="0.59" | 590 m || multiple || 1997–2020 || 09 Dec 2020 || 118 || align=left | Disc.: Spacewatch || 
|- id="2004 DM81" bgcolor=#d6d6d6
| 0 ||  || MBA-O || 16.54 || 2.7 km || multiple || 2004–2021 || 15 Apr 2021 || 104 || align=left | Disc.: Spacewatch || 
|- id="2004 DN81" bgcolor=#E9E9E9
| 0 ||  || MBA-M || 17.7 || data-sort-value="0.86" | 860 m || multiple || 1994–2021 || 14 Jun 2021 || 85 || align=left | Disc.: Kitt Peak Obs. || 
|- id="2004 DO81" bgcolor=#fefefe
| 0 ||  || MBA-I || 18.0 || data-sort-value="0.75" | 750 m || multiple || 2004–2021 || 04 Jan 2021 || 73 || align=left | Disc.: Spacewatch || 
|- id="2004 DP81" bgcolor=#d6d6d6
| 0 ||  || HIL || 16.0 || 3.5 km || multiple || 1996–2020 || 25 May 2020 || 115 || align=left | Disc.: Kitt Peak Obs.Alt.: 2010 CK253 || 
|- id="2004 DQ81" bgcolor=#E9E9E9
| 0 ||  || MBA-M || 17.9 || 1.1 km || multiple || 2004–2021 || 18 Jan 2021 || 65 || align=left | Disc.: Spacewatch || 
|- id="2004 DS81" bgcolor=#d6d6d6
| 0 ||  || MBA-O || 16.5 || 2.8 km || multiple || 2004–2020 || 11 May 2020 || 80 || align=left | Disc.: Astrovirtel || 
|- id="2004 DV81" bgcolor=#d6d6d6
| 0 ||  || MBA-O || 16.62 || 2.6 km || multiple || 2004–2021 || 12 May 2021 || 100 || align=left | Disc.: Spacewatch || 
|- id="2004 DX81" bgcolor=#fefefe
| 0 ||  || MBA-I || 18.0 || data-sort-value="0.75" | 750 m || multiple || 2004–2021 || 09 Jan 2021 || 83 || align=left | Disc.: Kitt Peak Obs. || 
|- id="2004 DY81" bgcolor=#fefefe
| 0 ||  || MBA-I || 17.9 || data-sort-value="0.78" | 780 m || multiple || 2004–2021 || 17 Jan 2021 || 98 || align=left | Disc.: Spacewatch || 
|- id="2004 DZ81" bgcolor=#d6d6d6
| 0 ||  || MBA-O || 17.2 || 2.0 km || multiple || 2004–2020 || 22 Mar 2020 || 69 || align=left | Disc.: SDSS || 
|- id="2004 DC82" bgcolor=#E9E9E9
| 0 ||  || MBA-M || 17.18 || 2.0 km || multiple || 2004–2021 || 30 Nov 2021 || 121 || align=left | Disc.: Spacewatch || 
|- id="2004 DD82" bgcolor=#d6d6d6
| 0 ||  || MBA-O || 16.94 || 2.3 km || multiple || 2004–2022 || 27 Jan 2022 || 72 || align=left | Disc.: Kitt Peak Obs. || 
|- id="2004 DF82" bgcolor=#d6d6d6
| 0 ||  || MBA-O || 16.5 || 2.8 km || multiple || 2004–2020 || 16 Mar 2020 || 78 || align=left | Disc.: SpacewatchAlt.: 2010 NN91 || 
|- id="2004 DG82" bgcolor=#d6d6d6
| 0 ||  || MBA-O || 16.5 || 2.8 km || multiple || 2004–2020 || 26 Apr 2020 || 75 || align=left | Disc.: Spacewatch || 
|- id="2004 DH82" bgcolor=#E9E9E9
| 0 ||  || MBA-M || 17.4 || 1.8 km || multiple || 1995–2018 || 18 Mar 2018 || 55 || align=left | Disc.: SDSS || 
|- id="2004 DJ82" bgcolor=#d6d6d6
| 0 ||  || MBA-O || 16.7 || 2.5 km || multiple || 2004–2020 || 15 Mar 2020 || 65 || align=left | Disc.: LPL/Spacewatch II || 
|- id="2004 DL82" bgcolor=#fefefe
| 0 ||  || MBA-I || 18.69 || data-sort-value="0.54" | 540 m || multiple || 2004–2022 || 06 Jan 2022 || 58 || align=left | Disc.: Spacewatch || 
|- id="2004 DM82" bgcolor=#d6d6d6
| 0 ||  || MBA-O || 16.1 || 3.4 km || multiple || 2004–2021 || 08 Jun 2021 || 133 || align=left | Disc.: SpacewatchAlt.: 2006 QK162 || 
|- id="2004 DN82" bgcolor=#d6d6d6
| 0 ||  || MBA-O || 17.0 || 2.2 km || multiple || 2004–2021 || 08 Jun 2021 || 47 || align=left | Disc.: SDSS || 
|- id="2004 DO82" bgcolor=#E9E9E9
| 0 ||  || MBA-M || 17.27 || 2.0 km || multiple || 2004–2021 || 17 Dec 2021 || 177 || align=left | Disc.: Spacewatch || 
|- id="2004 DP82" bgcolor=#fefefe
| 0 ||  || MBA-I || 18.1 || data-sort-value="0.71" | 710 m || multiple || 1996–2021 || 04 Jan 2021 || 88 || align=left | Disc.: Kitt Peak Obs. || 
|- id="2004 DR82" bgcolor=#fefefe
| 0 ||  || MBA-I || 18.4 || data-sort-value="0.62" | 620 m || multiple || 2004–2021 || 07 Jun 2021 || 91 || align=left | Disc.: Kitt Peak Obs. || 
|- id="2004 DS82" bgcolor=#d6d6d6
| 0 ||  || MBA-O || 16.9 || 2.3 km || multiple || 2001–2020 || 26 Apr 2020 || 68 || align=left | Disc.: Astrovirtel || 
|- id="2004 DU82" bgcolor=#d6d6d6
| 0 ||  || MBA-O || 16.60 || 2.7 km || multiple || 2004–2021 || 17 Apr 2021 || 70 || align=left | Disc.: Spacewatch || 
|- id="2004 DV82" bgcolor=#d6d6d6
| 0 ||  || MBA-O || 16.6 || 2.7 km || multiple || 2004–2021 || 02 May 2021 || 64 || align=left | Disc.: Kitt Peak Obs. || 
|- id="2004 DW82" bgcolor=#fefefe
| 1 ||  || MBA-I || 18.2 || data-sort-value="0.68" | 680 m || multiple || 2004–2021 || 17 Jan 2021 || 87 || align=left | Disc.: Spacewatch || 
|- id="2004 DX82" bgcolor=#E9E9E9
| 0 ||  || MBA-M || 17.74 || data-sort-value="0.84" | 840 m || multiple || 2004–2021 || 11 Jun 2021 || 96 || align=left | Disc.: Spacewatch || 
|- id="2004 DY82" bgcolor=#fefefe
| 0 ||  || MBA-I || 18.4 || data-sort-value="0.62" | 620 m || multiple || 2004–2020 || 07 Dec 2020 || 117 || align=left | Disc.: LPL/Spacewatch II || 
|- id="2004 DA83" bgcolor=#d6d6d6
| 0 ||  || MBA-O || 16.5 || 2.8 km || multiple || 2004–2020 || 27 Feb 2020 || 64 || align=left | Disc.: Spacewatch || 
|- id="2004 DB83" bgcolor=#E9E9E9
| 0 ||  || MBA-M || 16.93 || 1.2 km || multiple || 2001–2021 || 11 Apr 2021 || 79 || align=left | Disc.: Spacewatch || 
|- id="2004 DC83" bgcolor=#fefefe
| 0 ||  || MBA-I || 18.3 || data-sort-value="0.65" | 650 m || multiple || 2004–2021 || 16 Jun 2021 || 69 || align=left | Disc.: Kitt Peak Obs. || 
|- id="2004 DD83" bgcolor=#d6d6d6
| 1 ||  || MBA-O || 17.0 || 2.2 km || multiple || 2004–2019 || 10 Jan 2019 || 43 || align=left | Disc.: Kitt Peak Obs. || 
|- id="2004 DE83" bgcolor=#fefefe
| 0 ||  || MBA-I || 18.23 || data-sort-value="0.67" | 670 m || multiple || 2004–2021 || 30 Oct 2021 || 95 || align=left | Disc.: Kitt Peak Obs. || 
|- id="2004 DG83" bgcolor=#fefefe
| 0 ||  || MBA-I || 18.34 || data-sort-value="0.64" | 640 m || multiple || 2004–2022 || 07 Jan 2022 || 56 || align=left | Disc.: SDSS || 
|- id="2004 DH83" bgcolor=#d6d6d6
| 0 ||  || MBA-O || 16.58 || 2.7 km || multiple || 2004–2021 || 07 Jun 2021 || 140 || align=left | Disc.: Spacewatch || 
|- id="2004 DJ83" bgcolor=#E9E9E9
| 0 ||  || MBA-M || 17.3 || 1.9 km || multiple || 2001–2021 || 18 Jan 2021 || 87 || align=left | Disc.: Kitt Peak Obs. || 
|- id="2004 DK83" bgcolor=#E9E9E9
| 0 ||  || MBA-M || 17.6 || data-sort-value="0.90" | 900 m || multiple || 2004–2021 || 14 Jun 2021 || 74 || align=left | Disc.: LPL/Spacewatch II || 
|- id="2004 DL83" bgcolor=#E9E9E9
| 0 ||  || MBA-M || 17.94 || data-sort-value="0.77" | 770 m || multiple || 2004–2021 || 14 Apr 2021 || 88 || align=left | Disc.: Kitt Peak Obs. || 
|- id="2004 DN83" bgcolor=#d6d6d6
| 1 ||  || MBA-O || 17.9 || 1.5 km || multiple || 2004–2017 || 27 Nov 2017 || 45 || align=left | Disc.: LPL/Spacewatch II || 
|- id="2004 DO83" bgcolor=#d6d6d6
| 0 ||  || MBA-O || 16.1 || 3.4 km || multiple || 2004–2021 || 15 Jan 2021 || 71 || align=left | Disc.: Spacewatch || 
|- id="2004 DP83" bgcolor=#fefefe
| 0 ||  || MBA-I || 18.5 || data-sort-value="0.59" | 590 m || multiple || 2004–2020 || 16 Aug 2020 || 46 || align=left | Disc.: Spacewatch || 
|- id="2004 DQ83" bgcolor=#fefefe
| 0 ||  || MBA-I || 18.3 || data-sort-value="0.65" | 650 m || multiple || 2004–2019 || 03 Oct 2019 || 55 || align=left | Disc.: LPL/Spacewatch II || 
|- id="2004 DT83" bgcolor=#fefefe
| 0 ||  || MBA-I || 19.27 || data-sort-value="0.42" | 420 m || multiple || 2004–2022 || 07 Jan 2022 || 41 || align=left | Disc.: LPL/Spacewatch II || 
|- id="2004 DU83" bgcolor=#d6d6d6
| 0 ||  || MBA-O || 16.5 || 2.8 km || multiple || 2004–2021 || 18 Jan 2021 || 89 || align=left | Disc.: Kitt Peak Obs.Alt.: 2010 HK131 || 
|- id="2004 DV83" bgcolor=#fefefe
| 0 ||  || MBA-I || 18.6 || data-sort-value="0.57" | 570 m || multiple || 2004–2018 || 31 Dec 2018 || 34 || align=left | Disc.: Kitt Peak Obs. || 
|- id="2004 DW83" bgcolor=#d6d6d6
| 0 ||  || MBA-O || 17.14 || 2.1 km || multiple || 2004–2021 || 09 May 2021 || 49 || align=left | Disc.: LPL/Spacewatch II || 
|- id="2004 DX83" bgcolor=#fefefe
| 0 ||  || MBA-I || 18.7 || data-sort-value="0.54" | 540 m || multiple || 2004–2020 || 16 Dec 2020 || 60 || align=left | Disc.: Kitt Peak Obs. || 
|- id="2004 DY83" bgcolor=#d6d6d6
| 0 ||  || MBA-O || 16.49 || 2.8 km || multiple || 2004–2021 || 17 Apr 2021 || 117 || align=left | Disc.: Spacewatch || 
|- id="2004 DZ83" bgcolor=#d6d6d6
| 0 ||  || MBA-O || 16.6 || 2.7 km || multiple || 2002–2021 || 18 Jan 2021 || 104 || align=left | Disc.: Spacewatch || 
|- id="2004 DB84" bgcolor=#fefefe
| 0 ||  || MBA-I || 18.0 || data-sort-value="0.75" | 750 m || multiple || 2004–2020 || 07 Dec 2020 || 49 || align=left | Disc.: LPL/Spacewatch II || 
|- id="2004 DC84" bgcolor=#E9E9E9
| 0 ||  || MBA-M || 17.1 || 1.6 km || multiple || 2004–2021 || 16 Jan 2021 || 151 || align=left | Disc.: Spacewatch || 
|- id="2004 DD84" bgcolor=#E9E9E9
| 0 ||  || MBA-M || 17.7 || 1.2 km || multiple || 2004–2021 || 07 Jan 2021 || 54 || align=left | Disc.: Kitt Peak Obs. || 
|- id="2004 DE84" bgcolor=#fefefe
| 0 ||  || MBA-I || 18.28 || data-sort-value="0.66" | 660 m || multiple || 2004–2021 || 03 May 2021 || 77 || align=left | Disc.: Spacewatch || 
|- id="2004 DF84" bgcolor=#E9E9E9
| 0 ||  || MBA-M || 17.18 || 2.0 km || multiple || 2004–2022 || 27 Jan 2022 || 65 || align=left | Disc.: Spacewatch || 
|- id="2004 DG84" bgcolor=#fefefe
| 0 ||  || MBA-I || 18.3 || data-sort-value="0.65" | 650 m || multiple || 2004–2020 || 18 Oct 2020 || 44 || align=left | Disc.: Spacewatch || 
|- id="2004 DH84" bgcolor=#E9E9E9
| 0 ||  || MBA-M || 17.7 || 1.2 km || multiple || 2004–2019 || 27 Oct 2019 || 39 || align=left | Disc.: SDSS || 
|- id="2004 DJ84" bgcolor=#fefefe
| 0 ||  || MBA-I || 18.4 || data-sort-value="0.62" | 620 m || multiple || 2004–2021 || 06 Jan 2021 || 38 || align=left | Disc.: SDSS || 
|- id="2004 DK84" bgcolor=#fefefe
| 0 ||  || MBA-I || 18.8 || data-sort-value="0.52" | 520 m || multiple || 2004–2020 || 15 Oct 2020 || 45 || align=left | Disc.: Kitt Peak Obs. || 
|- id="2004 DN84" bgcolor=#E9E9E9
| 0 ||  || MBA-M || 17.71 || data-sort-value="0.85" | 850 m || multiple || 2004–2021 || 26 Aug 2021 || 76 || align=left | Disc.: Spacewatch || 
|- id="2004 DO84" bgcolor=#d6d6d6
| 0 ||  || MBA-O || 17.1 || 2.1 km || multiple || 2004–2020 || 27 Jan 2020 || 47 || align=left | Disc.: Spacewatch || 
|- id="2004 DP84" bgcolor=#d6d6d6
| 1 ||  || MBA-O || 17.3 || 1.9 km || multiple || 2004–2020 || 05 Jan 2020 || 34 || align=left | Disc.: Kitt Peak Obs. || 
|- id="2004 DQ84" bgcolor=#E9E9E9
| 0 ||  || MBA-M || 18.25 || data-sort-value="0.67" | 670 m || multiple || 2004–2021 || 14 May 2021 || 47 || align=left | Disc.: Spacewatch || 
|- id="2004 DR84" bgcolor=#E9E9E9
| 0 ||  || MBA-M || 17.18 || 2.0 km || multiple || 2004–2022 || 26 Jan 2022 || 52 || align=left | Disc.: Spacewatch || 
|- id="2004 DS84" bgcolor=#E9E9E9
| 3 ||  || MBA-M || 17.9 || 1.1 km || multiple || 2004–2021 || 16 Jan 2021 || 24 || align=left | Disc.: Kitt Peak Obs. || 
|- id="2004 DT84" bgcolor=#d6d6d6
| 1 ||  || MBA-O || 16.96 || 2.3 km || multiple || 2004–2021 || 17 Apr 2021 || 42 || align=left | Disc.: SpacewatchAlt.: 2010 AG137, 2010 NN122 || 
|- id="2004 DU84" bgcolor=#fefefe
| 0 ||  || MBA-I || 18.0 || data-sort-value="0.75" | 750 m || multiple || 2004–2021 || 07 Jan 2021 || 97 || align=left | Disc.: LPL/Spacewatch II || 
|- id="2004 DV84" bgcolor=#E9E9E9
| 0 ||  || MBA-M || 16.6 || 2.0 km || multiple || 2004–2021 || 18 Jan 2021 || 145 || align=left | Disc.: Spacewatch || 
|- id="2004 DW84" bgcolor=#E9E9E9
| 0 ||  || MBA-M || 17.63 || 1.3 km || multiple || 2004–2021 || 03 May 2021 || 112 || align=left | Disc.: Spacewatch || 
|- id="2004 DX84" bgcolor=#E9E9E9
| 1 ||  || MBA-M || 17.2 || 1.1 km || multiple || 2004–2020 || 14 Feb 2020 || 112 || align=left | Disc.: SDSS || 
|- id="2004 DZ84" bgcolor=#d6d6d6
| 0 ||  || MBA-O || 16.84 || 2.4 km || multiple || 2004–2021 || 31 May 2021 || 131 || align=left | Disc.: Spacewatch || 
|- id="2004 DB85" bgcolor=#fefefe
| 2 ||  || MBA-I || 19.0 || data-sort-value="0.47" | 470 m || multiple || 2004–2019 || 30 Aug 2019 || 84 || align=left | Disc.: Spacewatch || 
|- id="2004 DC85" bgcolor=#d6d6d6
| 0 ||  || MBA-O || 16.7 || 2.5 km || multiple || 2004–2021 || 17 Jan 2021 || 77 || align=left | Disc.: SDSS || 
|- id="2004 DD85" bgcolor=#d6d6d6
| 0 ||  || MBA-O || 16.5 || 2.8 km || multiple || 2004–2021 || 18 Jan 2021 || 88 || align=left | Disc.: Spacewatch || 
|- id="2004 DF85" bgcolor=#E9E9E9
| 0 ||  || MBA-M || 17.20 || 1.1 km || multiple || 2004–2021 || 14 Jun 2021 || 91 || align=left | Disc.: SDSS || 
|- id="2004 DG85" bgcolor=#d6d6d6
| 0 ||  || MBA-O || 16.0 || 3.5 km || multiple || 2004–2021 || 04 Jan 2021 || 80 || align=left | Disc.: Spacewatch || 
|- id="2004 DH85" bgcolor=#fefefe
| 0 ||  || MBA-I || 18.3 || data-sort-value="0.65" | 650 m || multiple || 2004–2020 || 15 Sep 2020 || 68 || align=left | Disc.: Spacewatch || 
|- id="2004 DK85" bgcolor=#d6d6d6
| 0 ||  || MBA-O || 17.08 || 2.1 km || multiple || 2004–2021 || 08 May 2021 || 60 || align=left | Disc.: Kitt Peak Obs. || 
|- id="2004 DL85" bgcolor=#d6d6d6
| 0 ||  || MBA-O || 16.4 || 2.9 km || multiple || 2004–2021 || 17 Jan 2021 || 86 || align=left | Disc.: Kitt Peak Obs. || 
|- id="2004 DM85" bgcolor=#fefefe
| 0 ||  || MBA-I || 17.9 || data-sort-value="0.78" | 780 m || multiple || 2004–2021 || 16 Jan 2021 || 67 || align=left | Disc.: SDSS || 
|- id="2004 DN85" bgcolor=#d6d6d6
| 0 ||  || MBA-O || 16.1 || 3.4 km || multiple || 1996–2021 || 18 Jan 2021 || 92 || align=left | Disc.: Spacewatch || 
|- id="2004 DO85" bgcolor=#E9E9E9
| 0 ||  || MBA-M || 17.59 || 1.7 km || multiple || 1998–2021 || 09 Dec 2021 || 98 || align=left | Disc.: Tenagra II Obs. || 
|- id="2004 DQ85" bgcolor=#E9E9E9
| 0 ||  || MBA-M || 18.22 || data-sort-value="0.67" | 670 m || multiple || 2004–2021 || 08 Apr 2021 || 71 || align=left | Disc.: Spacewatch || 
|- id="2004 DS85" bgcolor=#fefefe
| 0 ||  || MBA-I || 17.9 || data-sort-value="0.78" | 780 m || multiple || 2004–2021 || 18 Jan 2021 || 74 || align=left | Disc.: Astrovirtel || 
|- id="2004 DT85" bgcolor=#E9E9E9
| 0 ||  || MBA-M || 17.55 || data-sort-value="0.92" | 920 m || multiple || 1998–2021 || 03 May 2021 || 90 || align=left | Disc.: Tenagra II Obs. || 
|- id="2004 DU85" bgcolor=#d6d6d6
| 0 ||  || MBA-O || 17.57 || 1.7 km || multiple || 2004–2021 || 10 Aug 2021 || 81 || align=left | Disc.: Kitt Peak Obs. || 
|- id="2004 DV85" bgcolor=#fefefe
| 0 ||  || MBA-I || 17.95 || data-sort-value="0.76" | 760 m || multiple || 1997–2021 || 05 Dec 2021 || 79 || align=left | Disc.: SDSS || 
|- id="2004 DX85" bgcolor=#d6d6d6
| 0 ||  || MBA-O || 16.6 || 2.7 km || multiple || 2004–2021 || 23 Jan 2021 || 53 || align=left | Disc.: Spacewatch || 
|- id="2004 DA86" bgcolor=#fefefe
| 1 ||  || MBA-I || 19.2 || data-sort-value="0.43" | 430 m || multiple || 2004–2020 || 19 Jan 2020 || 46 || align=left | Disc.: Kitt Peak Obs. || 
|- id="2004 DB86" bgcolor=#fefefe
| 1 ||  || MBA-I || 18.1 || data-sort-value="0.71" | 710 m || multiple || 2004–2019 || 26 Sep 2019 || 41 || align=left | Disc.: Spacewatch || 
|- id="2004 DC86" bgcolor=#fefefe
| 0 ||  || HUN || 18.98 || data-sort-value="0.48" | 480 m || multiple || 2004–2021 || 03 May 2021 || 44 || align=left | Disc.: SDSS || 
|- id="2004 DD86" bgcolor=#d6d6d6
| 0 ||  || MBA-O || 16.88 || 2.3 km || multiple || 2004–2021 || 16 Apr 2021 || 68 || align=left | Disc.: Kitt Peak Obs. || 
|- id="2004 DE86" bgcolor=#fefefe
| 0 ||  || MBA-I || 18.4 || data-sort-value="0.62" | 620 m || multiple || 1995–2020 || 08 Dec 2020 || 70 || align=left | Disc.: Kitt Peak Obs. || 
|- id="2004 DF86" bgcolor=#fefefe
| 2 ||  || MBA-I || 18.5 || data-sort-value="0.59" | 590 m || multiple || 2004–2019 || 19 Nov 2019 || 41 || align=left | Disc.: Astrovirtel || 
|- id="2004 DG86" bgcolor=#fefefe
| 0 ||  || MBA-I || 18.2 || data-sort-value="0.68" | 680 m || multiple || 2004–2020 || 07 Dec 2020 || 111 || align=left | Disc.: Kitt Peak Obs. || 
|- id="2004 DH86" bgcolor=#d6d6d6
| 0 ||  || MBA-O || 16.4 || 2.9 km || multiple || 1995–2020 || 25 Feb 2020 || 69 || align=left | Disc.: SpacewatchAlt.: 1995 TC9 || 
|- id="2004 DJ86" bgcolor=#fefefe
| 0 ||  || MBA-I || 18.86 || data-sort-value="0.50" | 500 m || multiple || 2004–2021 || 26 Nov 2021 || 35 || align=left | Disc.: Kitt Peak Obs. || 
|- id="2004 DK86" bgcolor=#fefefe
| 0 ||  || MBA-I || 18.72 || data-sort-value="0.54" | 540 m || multiple || 2004–2021 || 12 Sep 2021 || 45 || align=left | Disc.: Spacewatch || 
|- id="2004 DL86" bgcolor=#E9E9E9
| 0 ||  || MBA-M || 17.8 || 1.2 km || multiple || 2004–2018 || 04 Jul 2018 || 34 || align=left | Disc.: SDSS || 
|- id="2004 DM86" bgcolor=#fefefe
| 1 ||  || MBA-I || 19.0 || data-sort-value="0.47" | 470 m || multiple || 2004–2019 || 29 Sep 2019 || 33 || align=left | Disc.: Kitt Peak Obs. || 
|- id="2004 DN86" bgcolor=#fefefe
| 0 ||  || MBA-I || 18.50 || data-sort-value="0.59" | 590 m || multiple || 2004–2021 || 01 Nov 2021 || 55 || align=left | Disc.: SDSS || 
|- id="2004 DO86" bgcolor=#E9E9E9
| 2 ||  || MBA-M || 17.1 || 1.1 km || multiple || 2004–2020 || 25 Feb 2020 || 71 || align=left | Disc.: Spacewatch || 
|- id="2004 DP86" bgcolor=#E9E9E9
| 0 ||  || MBA-M || 17.83 || data-sort-value="0.81" | 810 m || multiple || 2004–2021 || 02 May 2021 || 54 || align=left | Disc.: SDSS || 
|- id="2004 DQ86" bgcolor=#fefefe
| 1 ||  || HUN || 19.0 || data-sort-value="0.47" | 470 m || multiple || 2000–2019 || 19 Dec 2019 || 44 || align=left | Disc.: Kitt Peak Obs. || 
|- id="2004 DR86" bgcolor=#E9E9E9
| 0 ||  || MBA-M || 16.9 || 2.3 km || multiple || 2004–2019 || 27 Oct 2019 || 33 || align=left | Disc.: Kitt Peak Obs. || 
|- id="2004 DS86" bgcolor=#fefefe
| 0 ||  || MBA-I || 18.4 || data-sort-value="0.62" | 620 m || multiple || 2004–2021 || 23 Jan 2021 || 38 || align=left | Disc.: Spacewatch || 
|- id="2004 DT86" bgcolor=#d6d6d6
| 0 ||  || MBA-O || 16.9 || 2.3 km || multiple || 2004–2020 || 30 Jan 2020 || 53 || align=left | Disc.: Kitt Peak Obs. || 
|- id="2004 DU86" bgcolor=#E9E9E9
| 2 ||  || MBA-M || 18.6 || data-sort-value="0.80" | 800 m || multiple || 2004–2019 || 28 Nov 2019 || 28 || align=left | Disc.: Kitt Peak Obs. || 
|- id="2004 DV86" bgcolor=#E9E9E9
| 0 ||  || MBA-M || 17.65 || 1.2 km || multiple || 2004–2021 || 09 Apr 2021 || 60 || align=left | Disc.: Spacewatch || 
|- id="2004 DW86" bgcolor=#d6d6d6
| 1 ||  || MBA-O || 17.87 || 1.5 km || multiple || 2004–2021 || 10 Sep 2021 || 31 || align=left | Disc.: Spacewatch || 
|- id="2004 DX86" bgcolor=#d6d6d6
| 0 ||  || MBA-O || 16.5 || 2.8 km || multiple || 2004–2020 || 19 Apr 2020 || 46 || align=left | Disc.: SDSS || 
|- id="2004 DY86" bgcolor=#E9E9E9
| 0 ||  || MBA-M || 17.9 || 1.1 km || multiple || 2004–2018 || 14 Jun 2018 || 24 || align=left | Disc.: Kitt Peak Obs. || 
|- id="2004 DZ86" bgcolor=#d6d6d6
| 0 ||  || MBA-O || 16.3 || 3.1 km || multiple || 2004–2021 || 07 Feb 2021 || 102 || align=left | Disc.: SDSS || 
|- id="2004 DA87" bgcolor=#E9E9E9
| 0 ||  || MBA-M || 17.5 || 1.3 km || multiple || 2004–2021 || 22 Jan 2021 || 136 || align=left | Disc.: Spacewatch || 
|- id="2004 DC87" bgcolor=#E9E9E9
| 0 ||  || MBA-M || 17.7 || 1.2 km || multiple || 2004–2021 || 18 Jan 2021 || 122 || align=left | Disc.: Kitt Peak Obs. || 
|- id="2004 DD87" bgcolor=#E9E9E9
| 0 ||  || MBA-M || 16.9 || 2.3 km || multiple || 2004–2020 || 16 Oct 2020 || 75 || align=left | Disc.: Spacewatch || 
|- id="2004 DF87" bgcolor=#fefefe
| 0 ||  || MBA-I || 18.1 || data-sort-value="0.71" | 710 m || multiple || 2004–2019 || 25 Sep 2019 || 75 || align=left | Disc.: Kitt Peak Obs. || 
|- id="2004 DG87" bgcolor=#d6d6d6
| 0 ||  || MBA-O || 17.3 || 1.9 km || multiple || 2004–2020 || 20 Apr 2020 || 57 || align=left | Disc.: LPL/Spacewatch II || 
|- id="2004 DH87" bgcolor=#fefefe
| 0 ||  || MBA-I || 18.41 || data-sort-value="0.62" | 620 m || multiple || 2004–2019 || 24 Aug 2019 || 54 || align=left | Disc.: Kitt Peak Obs. || 
|- id="2004 DJ87" bgcolor=#E9E9E9
| 0 ||  || MBA-M || 17.5 || data-sort-value="0.94" | 940 m || multiple || 2004–2020 || 23 Apr 2020 || 60 || align=left | Disc.: LPL/Spacewatch II || 
|- id="2004 DL87" bgcolor=#fefefe
| 0 ||  || MBA-I || 18.42 || data-sort-value="0.62" | 620 m || multiple || 2004–2021 || 11 May 2021 || 76 || align=left | Disc.: SDSS || 
|- id="2004 DO87" bgcolor=#d6d6d6
| 0 ||  || MBA-O || 16.8 || 2.4 km || multiple || 2004–2021 || 17 Jan 2021 || 68 || align=left | Disc.: Spacewatch || 
|- id="2004 DP87" bgcolor=#E9E9E9
| 0 ||  || MBA-M || 17.9 || 1.1 km || multiple || 2004–2021 || 16 Jan 2021 || 52 || align=left | Disc.: LPL/Spacewatch II || 
|- id="2004 DQ87" bgcolor=#fefefe
| 0 ||  || MBA-I || 18.60 || data-sort-value="0.57" | 570 m || multiple || 2004–2021 || 27 Oct 2021 || 67 || align=left | Disc.: Kitt Peak Obs. || 
|- id="2004 DR87" bgcolor=#E9E9E9
| 0 ||  || MBA-M || 17.6 || 1.7 km || multiple || 2004–2020 || 25 Oct 2020 || 51 || align=left | Disc.: Kitt Peak Obs. || 
|- id="2004 DS87" bgcolor=#fefefe
| 0 ||  || MBA-I || 18.8 || data-sort-value="0.52" | 520 m || multiple || 2004–2020 || 17 Dec 2020 || 67 || align=left | Disc.: Spacewatch || 
|- id="2004 DT87" bgcolor=#fefefe
| 0 ||  || MBA-I || 19.1 || data-sort-value="0.45" | 450 m || multiple || 2004–2019 || 08 Jun 2019 || 31 || align=left | Disc.: Kitt Peak Obs. || 
|- id="2004 DU87" bgcolor=#E9E9E9
| 0 ||  || MBA-M || 17.5 || 1.8 km || multiple || 2004–2020 || 16 Dec 2020 || 39 || align=left | Disc.: Spacewatch || 
|- id="2004 DV87" bgcolor=#E9E9E9
| 0 ||  || MBA-M || 17.6 || 1.3 km || multiple || 2004–2020 || 14 Dec 2020 || 40 || align=left | Disc.: Spacewatch || 
|- id="2004 DW87" bgcolor=#fefefe
| 0 ||  || MBA-I || 19.0 || data-sort-value="0.47" | 470 m || multiple || 2004–2018 || 07 Aug 2018 || 36 || align=left | Disc.: Spacewatch || 
|- id="2004 DX87" bgcolor=#E9E9E9
| 2 ||  || MBA-M || 18.4 || data-sort-value="0.62" | 620 m || multiple || 2004–2020 || 20 Jan 2020 || 37 || align=left | Disc.: Spacewatch || 
|- id="2004 DY87" bgcolor=#d6d6d6
| 0 ||  || MBA-O || 17.1 || 2.1 km || multiple || 2004–2021 || 16 Jan 2021 || 31 || align=left | Disc.: Kitt Peak Obs. || 
|- id="2004 DZ87" bgcolor=#fefefe
| 0 ||  || MBA-I || 19.21 || data-sort-value="0.43" | 430 m || multiple || 2004–2021 || 01 Dec 2021 || 34 || align=left | Disc.: Kitt Peak Obs. || 
|- id="2004 DA88" bgcolor=#d6d6d6
| 2 ||  || MBA-O || 17.6 || 1.7 km || multiple || 2004–2019 || 05 Feb 2019 || 31 || align=left | Disc.: Kitt Peak Obs. || 
|- id="2004 DB88" bgcolor=#d6d6d6
| 0 ||  || MBA-O || 16.9 || 2.3 km || multiple || 2004–2017 || 26 Jul 2017 || 40 || align=left | Disc.: Kitt Peak Obs. || 
|- id="2004 DC88" bgcolor=#d6d6d6
| 0 ||  || MBA-O || 16.9 || 2.3 km || multiple || 2004–2021 || 14 Jan 2021 || 59 || align=left | Disc.: Spacewatch || 
|- id="2004 DD88" bgcolor=#d6d6d6
| 0 ||  || MBA-O || 16.4 || 2.9 km || multiple || 2004–2021 || 10 Jan 2021 || 50 || align=left | Disc.: Spacewatch || 
|- id="2004 DE88" bgcolor=#fefefe
| 0 ||  || MBA-I || 18.2 || data-sort-value="0.68" | 680 m || multiple || 1999–2021 || 14 Jan 2021 || 47 || align=left | Disc.: Kitt Peak Obs. || 
|- id="2004 DF88" bgcolor=#d6d6d6
| 0 ||  || MBA-O || 16.5 || 2.8 km || multiple || 2004–2021 || 17 Jan 2021 || 79 || align=left | Disc.: Spacewatch || 
|- id="2004 DG88" bgcolor=#fefefe
| 0 ||  || MBA-I || 18.4 || data-sort-value="0.62" | 620 m || multiple || 2004–2020 || 14 Sep 2020 || 39 || align=left | Disc.: LPL/Spacewatch II || 
|- id="2004 DH88" bgcolor=#fefefe
| 0 ||  || MBA-I || 19.3 || data-sort-value="0.41" | 410 m || multiple || 2004–2018 || 20 Jan 2018 || 37 || align=left | Disc.: LPL/Spacewatch II || 
|- id="2004 DJ88" bgcolor=#E9E9E9
| 0 ||  || MBA-M || 18.0 || 1.4 km || multiple || 2004–2019 || 29 Jul 2019 || 32 || align=left | Disc.: Kitt Peak Obs. || 
|- id="2004 DK88" bgcolor=#E9E9E9
| 2 ||  || MBA-M || 18.2 || data-sort-value="0.68" | 680 m || multiple || 2004–2020 || 27 Jan 2020 || 38 || align=left | Disc.: Spacewatch || 
|- id="2004 DM88" bgcolor=#E9E9E9
| 0 ||  || MBA-M || 18.01 || 1.4 km || multiple || 2004–2021 || 03 Dec 2021 || 98 || align=left | Disc.: Kitt Peak Obs. || 
|- id="2004 DN88" bgcolor=#fefefe
| 1 ||  || MBA-I || 18.8 || data-sort-value="0.52" | 520 m || multiple || 2004–2020 || 17 Aug 2020 || 35 || align=left | Disc.: Kitt Peak Obs. || 
|- id="2004 DO88" bgcolor=#E9E9E9
| 0 ||  || MBA-M || 17.95 || 1.1 km || multiple || 2004–2021 || 03 May 2021 || 89 || align=left | Disc.: Spacewatch || 
|- id="2004 DP88" bgcolor=#E9E9E9
| 0 ||  || MBA-M || 17.4 || 1.8 km || multiple || 2004–2020 || 17 Nov 2020 || 88 || align=left | Disc.: Spacewatch || 
|- id="2004 DR88" bgcolor=#d6d6d6
| 0 ||  || MBA-O || 16.6 || 2.7 km || multiple || 2004–2021 || 13 Jun 2021 || 86 || align=left | Disc.: Spacewatch || 
|- id="2004 DS88" bgcolor=#d6d6d6
| 0 ||  || MBA-O || 16.78 || 2.5 km || multiple || 2004–2021 || 27 Jun 2021 || 87 || align=left | Disc.: Spacewatch || 
|- id="2004 DT88" bgcolor=#E9E9E9
| 1 ||  || MBA-M || 18.7 || data-sort-value="0.76" | 760 m || multiple || 2004–2019 || 01 Oct 2019 || 51 || align=left | Disc.: Astrovirtel || 
|- id="2004 DU88" bgcolor=#fefefe
| 0 ||  || MBA-I || 18.66 || data-sort-value="0.55" | 550 m || multiple || 1994–2021 || 08 Sep 2021 || 55 || align=left | Disc.: Kitt Peak Obs. || 
|- id="2004 DV88" bgcolor=#d6d6d6
| 0 ||  || MBA-O || 18.0 || 1.4 km || multiple || 2004–2020 || 03 Feb 2020 || 46 || align=left | Disc.: Spacewatch || 
|- id="2004 DW88" bgcolor=#fefefe
| 0 ||  || MBA-I || 18.2 || data-sort-value="0.68" | 680 m || multiple || 2004–2021 || 17 Jan 2021 || 64 || align=left | Disc.: Spacewatch || 
|- id="2004 DX88" bgcolor=#d6d6d6
| 0 ||  || MBA-O || 17.04 || 2.2 km || multiple || 2004–2021 || 13 May 2021 || 54 || align=left | Disc.: SDSS || 
|- id="2004 DY88" bgcolor=#fefefe
| 0 ||  || MBA-I || 18.77 || data-sort-value="0.52" | 520 m || multiple || 2004–2021 || 13 Apr 2021 || 44 || align=left | Disc.: LPL/Spacewatch II || 
|- id="2004 DZ88" bgcolor=#d6d6d6
| 0 ||  || MBA-O || 17.2 || 2.0 km || multiple || 1999–2020 || 22 Mar 2020 || 59 || align=left | Disc.: Spacewatch || 
|- id="2004 DA89" bgcolor=#d6d6d6
| 0 ||  || MBA-O || 17.67 || 1.6 km || multiple || 2004–2021 || 13 May 2021 || 38 || align=left | Disc.: Kitt Peak Obs. || 
|- id="2004 DB89" bgcolor=#d6d6d6
| 0 ||  || MBA-O || 17.6 || 1.7 km || multiple || 2004–2019 || 05 Nov 2019 || 46 || align=left | Disc.: Kitt Peak Obs. || 
|- id="2004 DC89" bgcolor=#E9E9E9
| 0 ||  || MBA-M || 17.7 || 1.6 km || multiple || 2004–2018 || 12 Feb 2018 || 32 || align=left | Disc.: Kitt Peak Obs. || 
|- id="2004 DD89" bgcolor=#fefefe
| 0 ||  || MBA-I || 19.1 || data-sort-value="0.45" | 450 m || multiple || 1995–2019 || 09 Jan 2019 || 32 || align=left | Disc.: Kitt Peak Obs. || 
|- id="2004 DE89" bgcolor=#d6d6d6
| 0 ||  || MBA-O || 17.3 || 1.9 km || multiple || 2004–2021 || 12 Jun 2021 || 43 || align=left | Disc.: Kitt Peak Obs. || 
|- id="2004 DF89" bgcolor=#d6d6d6
| 0 ||  || MBA-O || 17.08 || 2.1 km || multiple || 2004–2021 || 08 Apr 2021 || 38 || align=left | Disc.: LPL/Spacewatch II || 
|- id="2004 DG89" bgcolor=#fefefe
| 0 ||  || MBA-I || 18.90 || data-sort-value="0.49" | 490 m || multiple || 2004–2021 || 01 May 2021 || 54 || align=left | Disc.: Spacewatch || 
|- id="2004 DH89" bgcolor=#E9E9E9
| 0 ||  || MBA-M || 18.03 || 1.0 km || multiple || 2004–2021 || 09 Apr 2021 || 53 || align=left | Disc.: Spacewatch || 
|- id="2004 DJ89" bgcolor=#E9E9E9
| 2 ||  || MBA-M || 18.3 || data-sort-value="0.65" | 650 m || multiple || 2004–2020 || 24 Jan 2020 || 31 || align=left | Disc.: SDSS || 
|- id="2004 DK89" bgcolor=#E9E9E9
| 0 ||  || MBA-M || 17.5 || data-sort-value="0.94" | 940 m || multiple || 2004–2021 || 13 Jun 2021 || 56 || align=left | Disc.: Kitt Peak Obs. || 
|- id="2004 DM89" bgcolor=#fefefe
| 0 ||  || MBA-I || 18.3 || data-sort-value="0.65" | 650 m || multiple || 2004–2020 || 17 Nov 2020 || 52 || align=left | Disc.: Kitt Peak Obs.Added on 22 July 2020 || 
|- id="2004 DN89" bgcolor=#d6d6d6
| 0 ||  || MBA-O || 17.1 || 2.1 km || multiple || 2004–2020 || 14 Feb 2020 || 34 || align=left | Disc.: LPL/Spacewatch IIAdded on 22 July 2020 || 
|- id="2004 DP89" bgcolor=#d6d6d6
| 0 ||  || MBA-O || 17.3 || 1.9 km || multiple || 2004–2021 || 11 Jun 2021 || 40 || align=left | Disc.: SpacewatchAdded on 22 July 2020 || 
|- id="2004 DQ89" bgcolor=#fefefe
| 0 ||  || MBA-I || 18.59 || data-sort-value="0.57" | 570 m || multiple || 1993–2022 || 26 Jan 2022 || 49 || align=left | Disc.: Kitt Peak Obs.Added on 22 July 2020 || 
|- id="2004 DR89" bgcolor=#E9E9E9
| 0 ||  || MBA-M || 17.39 || 1.9 km || multiple || 2004–2022 || 12 Jan 2022 || 58 || align=left | Disc.: AstrovirtelAdded on 17 January 2021 || 
|- id="2004 DT89" bgcolor=#E9E9E9
| 0 ||  || MBA-M || 18.95 || data-sort-value="0.68" | 680 m || multiple || 2002–2021 || 14 Apr 2021 || 35 || align=left | Disc.: SpacewatchAdded on 11 May 2021 || 
|- id="2004 DU89" bgcolor=#fefefe
| 0 ||  || MBA-I || 19.07 || data-sort-value="0.46" | 460 m || multiple || 2001–2021 || 11 Jun 2021 || 48 || align=left | Disc.: SpacewatchAdded on 11 May 2021 || 
|- id="2004 DV89" bgcolor=#E9E9E9
| 1 ||  || MBA-M || 18.05 || data-sort-value="0.73" | 730 m || multiple || 2004–2021 || 01 May 2021 || 48 || align=left | Disc.: SpacewatchAdded on 11 May 2021 || 
|- id="2004 DW89" bgcolor=#E9E9E9
| 0 ||  || MBA-M || 17.46 || 1.8 km || multiple || 2004–2022 || 13 Jan 2022 || 63 || align=left | Disc.: Kitt Peak Obs.Added on 21 August 2021 || 
|}
back to top

E 

|- id="2004 EF" bgcolor=#E9E9E9
| 0 || 2004 EF || MBA-M || 17.09 || 1.1 km || multiple || 2004–2021 || 30 Jul 2021 || 139 || align=left | Disc.: Table Mountain Obs.Alt.: 2011 YO46 || 
|- id="2004 EM" bgcolor=#fefefe
| 0 || 2004 EM || MBA-I || 17.80 || data-sort-value="0.82" | 820 m || multiple || 2004–2021 || 08 Nov 2021 || 128 || align=left | Disc.: Emerald Lane Obs.Alt.: 2010 VV102 || 
|- id="2004 EU" bgcolor=#FA8072
| 1 || 2004 EU || MCA || 18.2 || data-sort-value="0.68" | 680 m || multiple || 2004–2020 || 05 Nov 2020 || 175 || align=left | Disc.: NEAT || 
|- id="2004 EY" bgcolor=#fefefe
| 0 || 2004 EY || HUN || 17.86 || data-sort-value="0.80" | 800 m || multiple || 2004–2021 || 02 Nov 2021 || 163 || align=left | Disc.: LINEARAlt.: 2012 DT3 || 
|- id="2004 EC1" bgcolor=#d6d6d6
| 0 ||  || MBA-O || 17.29 || 1.9 km || multiple || 2004–2021 || 10 May 2021 || 51 || align=left | Disc.: Table Mountain Obs. || 
|- id="2004 EH1" bgcolor=#FFC2E0
| 5 ||  || APO || 22.4 || data-sort-value="0.12" | 120 m || single || 26 days || 09 Apr 2004 || 117 || align=left | Disc.: SSS || 
|- id="2004 EJ1" bgcolor=#FFC2E0
| 3 ||  || AMO || 21.7 || data-sort-value="0.16" | 160 m || single || 103 days || 30 May 2004 || 151 || align=left | Disc.: LINEAR || 
|- id="2004 EL1" bgcolor=#fefefe
| 2 ||  || HUN || 18.8 || data-sort-value="0.52" | 520 m || multiple || 2004–2018 || 10 Nov 2018 || 74 || align=left | Disc.: NEAT || 
|- id="2004 ER4" bgcolor=#E9E9E9
| 1 ||  || MBA-M || 18.0 || data-sort-value="0.75" | 750 m || multiple || 2004–2021 || 08 Jun 2021 || 34 || align=left | Disc.: NEAT || 
|- id="2004 EW4" bgcolor=#fefefe
| 1 ||  || MBA-I || 17.9 || data-sort-value="0.78" | 780 m || multiple || 2003–2018 || 14 Apr 2018 || 79 || align=left | Disc.: NEATAlt.: 2011 FP1 || 
|- id="2004 EG6" bgcolor=#E9E9E9
| 1 ||  || MBA-M || 17.6 || 1.7 km || multiple || 2004–2017 || 18 Mar 2017 || 27 || align=left | Disc.: NEAT || 
|- id="2004 EU6" bgcolor=#fefefe
| 0 ||  || HUN || 18.15 || data-sort-value="0.70" | 700 m || multiple || 2004–2021 || 01 Nov 2021 || 190 || align=left | Disc.: NEATAlt.: 2013 RU79 || 
|- id="2004 EB8" bgcolor=#E9E9E9
| 0 ||  || MBA-M || 17.25 || 1.5 km || multiple || 2000–2021 || 10 Jun 2021 || 153 || align=left | Disc.: NEAT || 
|- id="2004 EH9" bgcolor=#E9E9E9
| 0 ||  || MBA-M || 17.03 || 1.2 km || multiple || 2004–2021 || 27 Jun 2021 || 127 || align=left | Disc.: LINEAR || 
|- id="2004 EK9" bgcolor=#E9E9E9
| 1 ||  || MBA-M || 17.5 || 1.8 km || multiple || 2004–2018 || 03 Oct 2018 || 59 || align=left | Disc.: LINEARAlt.: 2013 FA5 || 
|- id="2004 ER9" bgcolor=#FA8072
| 1 ||  || HUN || 18.2 || data-sort-value="0.68" | 680 m || multiple || 2004–2020 || 09 Dec 2020 || 165 || align=left | Disc.: Spacewatch || 
|- id="2004 EE11" bgcolor=#E9E9E9
| 0 ||  || MBA-M || 17.9 || 1.1 km || multiple || 2004–2021 || 18 Jan 2021 || 89 || align=left | Disc.: Tenagra II Obs.Alt.: 2017 BH101 || 
|- id="2004 EO12" bgcolor=#fefefe
| 0 ||  || MBA-I || 18.4 || data-sort-value="0.62" | 620 m || multiple || 2004–2021 || 17 Jan 2021 || 181 || align=left | Disc.: NEAT || 
|- id="2004 EC13" bgcolor=#fefefe
| 1 ||  || MBA-I || 17.7 || data-sort-value="0.86" | 860 m || multiple || 2004–2019 || 25 Sep 2019 || 139 || align=left | Disc.: NEAT || 
|- id="2004 EB15" bgcolor=#FA8072
| 0 ||  || MCA || 19.08 || data-sort-value="0.45" | 450 m || multiple || 2004–2021 || 12 May 2021 || 116 || align=left | Disc.: NEAT || 
|- id="2004 EY15" bgcolor=#E9E9E9
| 0 ||  || MBA-M || 16.75 || 2.5 km || multiple || 2004–2021 || 02 Dec 2021 || 128 || align=left | Disc.: NEAT || 
|- id="2004 EO16" bgcolor=#d6d6d6
| 0 ||  || MBA-O || 16.28 || 3.1 km || multiple || 2004–2021 || 03 May 2021 || 107 || align=left | Disc.: NEATAlt.: 2010 CJ221, 2010 OV112 || 
|- id="2004 EK20" bgcolor=#FA8072
| 2 ||  || MCA || 19.2 || data-sort-value="0.80" | 800 m || multiple || 2004–2013 || 18 Mar 2013 || 71 || align=left | Disc.: LINEARAlt.: 2013 EM11 || 
|- id="2004 EL20" bgcolor=#FFC2E0
| 8 ||  || ATE || 26.7 || data-sort-value="0.016" | 16 m || single || 3 days || 16 Mar 2004 || 20 || align=left | Disc.: LINEAR || 
|- id="2004 EO20" bgcolor=#FFC2E0
| 3 ||  || AMO || 22.5 || data-sort-value="0.11" | 110 m || multiple || 2004–2019 || 05 Dec 2019 || 72 || align=left | Disc.: LINEAR || 
|- id="2004 ER20" bgcolor=#fefefe
| 0 ||  || MBA-I || 17.0 || 1.2 km || multiple || 1994–2021 || 06 Jan 2021 || 198 || align=left | Disc.: NEATAlt.: 2001 OO91 || 
|- id="2004 EU20" bgcolor=#FA8072
| 0 ||  || MCA || 16.4 || 1.3 km || multiple || 1998–2021 || 12 Jun 2021 || 509 || align=left | Disc.: LINEAR || 
|- id="2004 EY20" bgcolor=#E9E9E9
| 0 ||  || MBA-M || 17.1 || 1.6 km || multiple || 2003–2021 || 16 Jan 2021 || 117 || align=left | Disc.: Tenagra II Obs. || 
|- id="2004 ER21" bgcolor=#FFC2E0
| 8 ||  || ATE || 24.4 || data-sort-value="0.047" | 47 m || single || 11 days || 25 Mar 2004 || 70 || align=left | Disc.: LINEAR || 
|- id="2004 ET21" bgcolor=#FFC2E0
| 2 ||  || AMO || 20.5 || data-sort-value="0.28" | 280 m || multiple || 2004–2009 || 14 Oct 2009 || 42 || align=left | Disc.: Spacewatch || 
|- id="2004 EU22" bgcolor=#FFC2E0
| 1 ||  || APO || 23.7 || data-sort-value="0.065" | 65 m || multiple || 2004–2018 || 13 Apr 2018 || 187 || align=left | Disc.: LINEAR || 
|- id="2004 EW24" bgcolor=#FA8072
| 1 ||  || MCA || 18.7 || data-sort-value="0.54" | 540 m || multiple || 2001–2020 || 15 Oct 2020 || 101 || align=left | Disc.: Spacewatch || 
|- id="2004 EY24" bgcolor=#fefefe
| 0 ||  || HUN || 18.60 || data-sort-value="0.57" | 570 m || multiple || 2004–2022 || 09 Jan 2022 || 95 || align=left | Disc.: SpacewatchAlt.: 2010 RD72 || 
|- id="2004 EC25" bgcolor=#d6d6d6
| 0 ||  || MBA-O || 16.7 || 2.5 km || multiple || 2004–2020 || 25 May 2020 || 94 || align=left | Disc.: NEAT || 
|- id="2004 EG26" bgcolor=#E9E9E9
| 0 ||  || MBA-M || 17.28 || 1.0 km || multiple || 2001–2021 || 30 Jul 2021 || 155 || align=left | Disc.: Spacewatch || 
|- id="2004 EN26" bgcolor=#E9E9E9
| 0 ||  || MBA-M || 17.69 || 1.2 km || multiple || 2004–2021 || 17 Apr 2021 || 104 || align=left | Disc.: SpacewatchAlt.: 2010 TO68, 2014 RM53 || 
|- id="2004 EU27" bgcolor=#E9E9E9
| 0 ||  || MBA-M || 18.45 || data-sort-value="0.86" | 860 m || multiple || 2004–2021 || 03 May 2021 || 53 || align=left | Disc.: Spacewatch || 
|- id="2004 EW27" bgcolor=#E9E9E9
| 0 ||  || MBA-M || 17.2 || 2.0 km || multiple || 2004–2020 || 05 Dec 2020 || 98 || align=left | Disc.: SpacewatchAlt.: 2015 US20, 2017 CQ11 || 
|- id="2004 EG28" bgcolor=#E9E9E9
| 0 ||  || MBA-M || 17.2 || 2.0 km || multiple || 2004–2021 || 11 Jan 2021 || 165 || align=left | Disc.: SpacewatchAlt.: 2006 SU239, 2011 WF105, 2014 NE1 || 
|- id="2004 EH28" bgcolor=#fefefe
| 0 ||  || MBA-I || 18.1 || data-sort-value="0.71" | 710 m || multiple || 2004–2018 || 15 Oct 2018 || 72 || align=left | Disc.: SpacewatchAlt.: 2017 DK41 || 
|- id="2004 EJ28" bgcolor=#E9E9E9
| 0 ||  || MBA-M || 17.3 || 1.0 km || multiple || 2000–2021 || 08 Jun 2021 || 142 || align=left | Disc.: Spacewatch || 
|- id="2004 EX28" bgcolor=#d6d6d6
| 1 ||  || MBA-O || 17.7 || 1.6 km || multiple || 2004–2020 || 26 Apr 2020 || 46 || align=left | Disc.: Spacewatch || 
|- id="2004 EZ28" bgcolor=#fefefe
| 1 ||  || MBA-I || 18.6 || data-sort-value="0.57" | 570 m || multiple || 2004–2019 || 21 Sep 2019 || 32 || align=left | Disc.: Spacewatch || 
|- id="2004 EA29" bgcolor=#d6d6d6
| 0 ||  || MBA-O || 16.59 || 2.7 km || multiple || 2004–2021 || 31 Jul 2021 || 154 || align=left | Disc.: LPL/Spacewatch IIAlt.: 2010 AR128, 2010 NF19, 2015 FJ119 || 
|- id="2004 EE29" bgcolor=#d6d6d6
| 1 ||  || MBA-O || 16.7 || 2.5 km || multiple || 2004–2021 || 17 Feb 2021 || 69 || align=left | Disc.: LPL/Spacewatch IIAdded on 30 September 2021Alt.: 2004 FK178, 2008 YX82 || 
|- id="2004 EF29" bgcolor=#d6d6d6
| 2 ||  || MBA-O || 17.37 || 1.9 km || multiple || 2004–2021 || 08 Nov 2021 || 36 || align=left | Disc.: LPL/Spacewatch IIAdded on 24 December 2021 || 
|- id="2004 ER29" bgcolor=#d6d6d6
| 0 ||  || MBA-O || 17.0 || 2.2 km || multiple || 2004–2020 || 23 Apr 2020 || 52 || align=left | Disc.: SpacewatchAlt.: 2015 HT31 || 
|- id="2004 ET29" bgcolor=#E9E9E9
| 0 ||  || MBA-M || 18.47 || data-sort-value="0.85" | 850 m || multiple || 2004–2021 || 13 May 2021 || 45 || align=left | Disc.: SpacewatchAdded on 11 May 2021 || 
|- id="2004 EU29" bgcolor=#d6d6d6
| 0 ||  || MBA-O || 17.6 || 1.7 km || multiple || 2004–2020 || 22 Mar 2020 || 84 || align=left | Disc.: SpacewatchAlt.: 2009 BX56 || 
|- id="2004 EY29" bgcolor=#E9E9E9
| 0 ||  || MBA-M || 18.47 || data-sort-value="0.85" | 850 m || multiple || 2004–2021 || 08 May 2021 || 69 || align=left | Disc.: Spacewatch || 
|- id="2004 EG30" bgcolor=#fefefe
| 2 ||  || MBA-I || 19.1 || data-sort-value="0.45" | 450 m || multiple || 2004–2020 || 17 Nov 2020 || 26 || align=left | Disc.: SpacewatchAlt.: 2020 UF37 || 
|- id="2004 EV30" bgcolor=#d6d6d6
| 0 ||  || MBA-O || 15.8 || 3.9 km || multiple || 2004–2020 || 16 Apr 2020 || 173 || align=left | Disc.: SpacewatchAlt.: 2010 CU258, 2015 FF344 || 
|- id="2004 ER33" bgcolor=#fefefe
| 3 ||  || HUN || 19.0 || data-sort-value="0.47" | 470 m || multiple || 2004–2019 || 01 May 2019 || 89 || align=left | Disc.: SpacewatchAlt.: 2019 FH2 || 
|- id="2004 EF34" bgcolor=#fefefe
| 0 ||  || MBA-I || 17.8 || data-sort-value="0.82" | 820 m || multiple || 2004–2020 || 16 Dec 2020 || 124 || align=left | Disc.: NEAT || 
|- id="2004 EQ36" bgcolor=#d6d6d6
| 0 ||  || MBA-O || 16.5 || 2.8 km || multiple || 2004–2020 || 08 Aug 2020 || 136 || align=left | Disc.: NEAT || 
|- id="2004 EC39" bgcolor=#fefefe
| 0 ||  || MBA-I || 17.3 || 1.0 km || multiple || 1997–2021 || 03 Jan 2021 || 87 || align=left | Disc.: Spacewatch || 
|- id="2004 EX42" bgcolor=#E9E9E9
| 0 ||  || MBA-M || 17.31 || 1.5 km || multiple || 2004–2021 || 06 May 2021 || 130 || align=left | Disc.: CSSAlt.: 2017 FH76 || 
|- id="2004 EG44" bgcolor=#E9E9E9
| 0 ||  || MBA-M || 17.4 || 1.4 km || multiple || 2000–2021 || 18 Jan 2021 || 106 || align=left | Disc.: Tenagra II Obs.Alt.: 2015 VG148 || 
|- id="2004 EN44" bgcolor=#d6d6d6
| 0 ||  || MBA-O || 17.8 || 1.5 km || multiple || 2004–2020 || 26 Apr 2020 || 36 || align=left | Disc.: SpacewatchAdded on 22 July 2020 || 
|- id="2004 ES44" bgcolor=#d6d6d6
| 0 ||  || MBA-O || 15.6 || 4.2 km || multiple || 2004–2021 || 19 Jan 2021 || 231 || align=left | Disc.: LPL/Spacewatch IIAlt.: 2004 FO164, 2010 LV29, 2015 BC559, 2016 ED23 || 
|- id="2004 ET44" bgcolor=#fefefe
| 0 ||  || MBA-I || 18.1 || data-sort-value="0.71" | 710 m || multiple || 2004–2020 || 26 Oct 2020 || 58 || align=left | Disc.: LPL/Spacewatch II || 
|- id="2004 EC45" bgcolor=#d6d6d6
| 2 ||  || MBA-O || 17.6 || 1.7 km || multiple || 2004–2021 || 10 May 2021 || 40 || align=left | Disc.: SpacewatchAdded on 21 August 2021Alt.: 2015 EM41 || 
|- id="2004 ED45" bgcolor=#d6d6d6
| 0 ||  || MBA-O || 16.9 || 2.3 km || multiple || 2004–2021 || 15 Apr 2021 || 42 || align=left | Disc.: SpacewatchAdded on 21 August 2021Alt.: 2015 AH240, 2021 EB45 || 
|- id="2004 EW45" bgcolor=#d6d6d6
| 2 ||  || MBA-O || 17.0 || 2.2 km || multiple || 2004–2020 || 22 Mar 2020 || 65 || align=left | Disc.: Spacewatch || 
|- id="2004 EQ46" bgcolor=#fefefe
| 1 ||  || MBA-I || 19.24 || data-sort-value="0.42" | 420 m || multiple || 2004–2020 || 14 Dec 2020 || 28 || align=left | Disc.: SpacewatchAlt.: 2011 FX53 || 
|- id="2004 ET46" bgcolor=#d6d6d6
| 0 ||  || MBA-O || 16.8 || 2.4 km || multiple || 2004–2020 || 27 Jan 2020 || 74 || align=left | Disc.: Spacewatch || 
|- id="2004 EA47" bgcolor=#d6d6d6
| 0 ||  || MBA-O || 17.1 || 2.1 km || multiple || 2004–2021 || 09 May 2021 || 37 || align=left | Disc.: Spacewatch || 
|- id="2004 EB47" bgcolor=#d6d6d6
| 2 ||  || MBA-O || 18.20 || 1.3 km || multiple || 2004–2021 || 30 May 2021 || 22 || align=left | Disc.: Spacewatch || 
|- id="2004 EK47" bgcolor=#fefefe
| 0 ||  || MBA-I || 18.69 || data-sort-value="0.54" | 540 m || multiple || 1995–2021 || 03 May 2021 || 66 || align=left | Disc.: LPL/Spacewatch II || 
|- id="2004 ES47" bgcolor=#FA8072
| 0 ||  || MCA || 18.80 || data-sort-value="0.52" | 520 m || multiple || 2004–2021 || 11 Jun 2021 || 100 || align=left | Disc.: CSS || 
|- id="2004 EE48" bgcolor=#fefefe
| 0 ||  || HUN || 18.2 || data-sort-value="0.68" | 680 m || multiple || 2004–2019 || 28 Oct 2019 || 67 || align=left | Disc.: LINEAR || 
|- id="2004 ET48" bgcolor=#d6d6d6
| – ||  || MBA-O || 17.6 || 1.7 km || single || 11 days || 26 Mar 2004 || 24 || align=left | Disc.: CSS || 
|- id="2004 EC49" bgcolor=#E9E9E9
| 1 ||  || MBA-M || 17.9 || 1.1 km || multiple || 2002–2017 || 15 Apr 2017 || 27 || align=left | Disc.: Spacewatch || 
|- id="2004 ES49" bgcolor=#E9E9E9
| 0 ||  || MBA-M || 16.56 || 1.4 km || multiple || 1993–2021 || 14 May 2021 || 174 || align=left | Disc.: Spacewatch || 
|- id="2004 EG51" bgcolor=#fefefe
| 0 ||  || MBA-I || 18.0 || data-sort-value="0.75" | 750 m || multiple || 1998–2021 || 04 Mar 2021 || 112 || align=left | Disc.: SpacewatchAlt.: 1998 SF31, 2012 TU277 || 
|- id="2004 EP51" bgcolor=#d6d6d6
| 0 ||  || MBA-O || 16.73 || 2.5 km || multiple || 2004–2021 || 06 Apr 2021 || 88 || align=left | Disc.: SpacewatchAlt.: 2010 MK85 || 
|- id="2004 EH54" bgcolor=#E9E9E9
| 2 ||  || MBA-M || 17.6 || data-sort-value="0.90" | 900 m || multiple || 2000–2020 || 04 Jan 2020 || 116 || align=left | Disc.: NEAT || 
|- id="2004 EG56" bgcolor=#FA8072
| 1 ||  || MCA || 17.6 || 1.7 km || multiple || 2004–2018 || 05 Oct 2018 || 65 || align=left | Disc.: NEAT || 
|- id="2004 EQ58" bgcolor=#fefefe
| 0 ||  || MBA-I || 18.04 || data-sort-value="0.73" | 730 m || multiple || 2004–2021 || 08 May 2021 || 116 || align=left | Disc.: LINEARAlt.: 2005 SZ222 || 
|- id="2004 EZ60" bgcolor=#fefefe
| 0 ||  || MBA-I || 17.89 || data-sort-value="0.79" | 790 m || multiple || 2004–2022 || 13 Jan 2022 || 102 || align=left | Disc.: NEATAlt.: 2011 CW31 || 
|- id="2004 EN61" bgcolor=#E9E9E9
| 0 ||  || MBA-M || 16.84 || 1.8 km || multiple || 2004–2021 || 02 May 2021 || 135 || align=left | Disc.: NEATAlt.: 2015 YG12 || 
|- id="2004 EQ62" bgcolor=#fefefe
| 0 ||  || MBA-I || 17.6 || data-sort-value="0.90" | 900 m || multiple || 2001–2021 || 04 Jan 2021 || 102 || align=left | Disc.: NEAT || 
|- id="2004 EV65" bgcolor=#E9E9E9
| 0 ||  || MBA-M || 17.5 || 1.3 km || multiple || 2004–2021 || 07 Jan 2021 || 44 || align=left | Disc.: SpacewatchAdded on 9 March 2021 || 
|- id="2004 ET67" bgcolor=#fefefe
| 2 ||  || MBA-I || 18.8 || data-sort-value="0.52" | 520 m || multiple || 2004–2017 || 26 Jan 2017 || 38 || align=left | Disc.: Spacewatch || 
|- id="2004 EO72" bgcolor=#fefefe
| 0 ||  || MBA-I || 19.16 || data-sort-value="0.44" | 440 m || multiple || 2004–2022 || 25 Jan 2022 || 42 || align=left | Disc.: CSSAlt.: 2015 FK359 || 
|- id="2004 EF74" bgcolor=#fefefe
| 0 ||  || MBA-I || 17.78 || data-sort-value="0.83" | 830 m || multiple || 2004–2021 || 07 Apr 2021 || 93 || align=left | Disc.: NEAT || 
|- id="2004 ED85" bgcolor=#E9E9E9
| 0 ||  || MBA-M || 17.15 || 1.1 km || multiple || 2004–2021 || 31 May 2021 || 98 || align=left | Disc.: LINEAR || 
|- id="2004 EF85" bgcolor=#E9E9E9
| 0 ||  || MBA-M || 16.9 || 2.3 km || multiple || 2004–2020 || 20 Oct 2020 || 59 || align=left | Disc.: LINEAR || 
|- id="2004 EO87" bgcolor=#fefefe
| 0 ||  || MBA-I || 18.7 || data-sort-value="0.54" | 540 m || multiple || 2004–2020 || 10 Dec 2020 || 133 || align=left | Disc.: Spacewatch || 
|- id="2004 EX87" bgcolor=#fefefe
| 0 ||  || MBA-I || 18.55 || data-sort-value="0.58" | 580 m || multiple || 2004–2021 || 08 Apr 2021 || 109 || align=left | Disc.: Spacewatch || 
|- id="2004 EC88" bgcolor=#d6d6d6
| 0 ||  || MBA-O || 16.48 || 2.8 km || multiple || 2004–2021 || 14 Apr 2021 || 87 || align=left | Disc.: Spacewatch || 
|- id="2004 EK88" bgcolor=#E9E9E9
| 0 ||  || MBA-M || 17.5 || 1.8 km || multiple || 2004–2019 || 26 Sep 2019 || 60 || align=left | Disc.: SpacewatchAlt.: 2014 QB48 || 
|- id="2004 ED89" bgcolor=#fefefe
| 0 ||  || MBA-I || 17.9 || data-sort-value="0.78" | 780 m || multiple || 2004–2020 || 03 Feb 2020 || 98 || align=left | Disc.: Spacewatch || 
|- id="2004 ES89" bgcolor=#fefefe
| 0 ||  || MBA-I || 17.9 || data-sort-value="0.78" | 780 m || multiple || 2004–2021 || 14 Jan 2021 || 73 || align=left | Disc.: SpacewatchAlt.: 2015 KB132 || 
|- id="2004 ET89" bgcolor=#fefefe
| 0 ||  || MBA-I || 17.9 || data-sort-value="0.78" | 780 m || multiple || 2004–2019 || 24 Aug 2019 || 52 || align=left | Disc.: Spacewatch || 
|- id="2004 EG91" bgcolor=#d6d6d6
| 1 ||  || MBA-O || 17.1 || 2.1 km || multiple || 2004–2021 || 02 Apr 2021 || 45 || align=left | Disc.: SpacewatchAdded on 9 March 2021Alt.: 2010 AG109, 2010 MG98 || 
|- id="2004 EC92" bgcolor=#E9E9E9
| 0 ||  || MBA-M || 16.9 || 2.3 km || multiple || 2002–2021 || 15 Jan 2021 || 157 || align=left | Disc.: Spacewatch || 
|- id="2004 ED92" bgcolor=#fefefe
| 0 ||  || MBA-I || 17.6 || data-sort-value="0.90" | 900 m || multiple || 2004–2019 || 28 Aug 2019 || 117 || align=left | Disc.: Spacewatch || 
|- id="2004 EN92" bgcolor=#fefefe
| 0 ||  || MBA-I || 18.0 || data-sort-value="0.75" | 750 m || multiple || 2004–2020 || 11 Dec 2020 || 108 || align=left | Disc.: SpacewatchAlt.: 2012 PZ24 || 
|- id="2004 EZ92" bgcolor=#fefefe
| 1 ||  || MBA-I || 17.2 || 1.1 km || multiple || 2004–2021 || 07 Jun 2021 || 181 || align=left | Disc.: LINEAR || 
|- id="2004 EC93" bgcolor=#fefefe
| 0 ||  || MBA-I || 18.4 || data-sort-value="0.62" | 620 m || multiple || 2004–2020 || 16 Aug 2020 || 70 || align=left | Disc.: Spacewatch || 
|- id="2004 EJ93" bgcolor=#d6d6d6
| 0 ||  || MBA-O || 16.68 || 2.6 km || multiple || 2004–2021 || 11 Jul 2021 || 165 || align=left | Disc.: SpacewatchAlt.: 2012 TZ227 || 
|- id="2004 EO95" bgcolor=#C2E0FF
| E ||  || TNO || 6.1 || 207 km || single || 1 day || 15 Mar 2004 || 3 || align=left | Disc.: Kitt Peak Obs.LoUTNOs, cubewano? || 
|- id="2004 EP95" bgcolor=#C2E0FF
| 6 ||  || TNO || 7.1 || 195 km || multiple || 2004–2005 || 10 Mar 2005 || 9 || align=left | Disc.: Kitt Peak Obs.LoUTNOs, cubewano (hot) || 
|- id="2004 EQ95" bgcolor=#C2E0FF
| E ||  || TNO || 7.4 || 114 km || single || 1 day || 16 Mar 2004 || 3 || align=left | Disc.: Kitt Peak Obs.LoUTNOs, cubewano? || 
|- id="2004 ER95" bgcolor=#C2E0FF
| E ||  || TNO || 6.3 || 189 km || single || 72 days || 26 May 2004 || 5 || align=left | Disc.: Kitt Peak Obs.LoUTNOs, cubewano? || 
|- id="2004 ES95" bgcolor=#C2E0FF
| 2 ||  || TNO || 6.8 || 145 km || multiple || 1999–2014 || 30 May 2014 || 23 || align=left | Disc.: Kitt Peak Obs.LoUTNOs, cubewano (cold) || 
|- id="2004 ET95" bgcolor=#C2E0FF
| E ||  || TNO || 7.3 || 119 km || single || 1 day || 16 Mar 2004 || 3 || align=left | Disc.: Kitt Peak Obs.LoUTNOs, cubewano? || 
|- id="2004 EV95" bgcolor=#C2E0FF
| 3 ||  || TNO || 7.6 || 143 km || multiple || 2004–2019 || 06 Jun 2019 || 23 || align=left | Disc.: Kitt Peak Obs.LoUTNOs, plutino || 
|- id="2004 EG96" bgcolor=#C2E0FF
| 3 ||  || TNO || 8.11 || 86 km || multiple || 2004–2021 || 09 Jul 2021 || 29 || align=left | Disc.: Kitt Peak Obs.LoUTNOs, res2:5, BR-mag: 1.39; taxonomy: BR-IR || 
|- id="2004 EJ96" bgcolor=#C2E0FF
| 2 ||  || TNO || 8.0 || 119 km || multiple || 2004–2013 || 14 May 2013 || 24 || align=left | Disc.: Kitt Peak Obs.LoUTNOs, plutinoAlt.: 2004 HE64 || 
|- id="2004 EK96" bgcolor=#fefefe
| 0 ||  || MBA-I || 17.6 || data-sort-value="0.90" | 900 m || multiple || 2004–2021 || 04 Jan 2021 || 129 || align=left | Disc.: NEATAlt.: 2009 SR46, 2011 EO41, 2015 LM17 || 
|- id="2004 ES96" bgcolor=#E9E9E9
| 0 ||  || MBA-M || 17.19 || 2.0 km || multiple || 2001–2022 || 27 Jan 2022 || 82 || align=left | Disc.: NEATAlt.: 2013 EG86 || 
|- id="2004 EV96" bgcolor=#fefefe
| 2 ||  || MBA-I || 19.0 || data-sort-value="0.47" | 470 m || multiple || 2004–2015 || 23 May 2015 || 32 || align=left | Disc.: NEAT || 
|- id="2004 EZ96" bgcolor=#E9E9E9
| 0 ||  || MBA-M || 17.08 || 1.1 km || multiple || 2004–2021 || 28 Jul 2021 || 143 || align=left | Disc.: NEATAlt.: 2018 VB78 || 
|- id="2004 EJ97" bgcolor=#E9E9E9
| 0 ||  || MBA-M || 17.19 || 1.5 km || multiple || 2004–2021 || 08 Apr 2021 || 143 || align=left | Disc.: SpacewatchAlt.: 2008 AQ26, 2014 QL357 || 
|- id="2004 EO97" bgcolor=#fefefe
| 0 ||  || MBA-I || 18.3 || data-sort-value="0.65" | 650 m || multiple || 2004–2020 || 10 Dec 2020 || 59 || align=left | Disc.: Spacewatch || 
|- id="2004 EF98" bgcolor=#E9E9E9
| 0 ||  || MBA-M || 17.5 || data-sort-value="0.94" | 940 m || multiple || 2004–2021 || 14 Jun 2021 || 87 || align=left | Disc.: Spacewatch || 
|- id="2004 ET98" bgcolor=#E9E9E9
| 0 ||  || MBA-M || 18.00 || 1.1 km || multiple || 2004–2021 || 15 Apr 2021 || 88 || align=left | Disc.: Spacewatch || 
|- id="2004 EY98" bgcolor=#d6d6d6
| 0 ||  || MBA-O || 16.4 || 2.9 km || multiple || 2004–2020 || 21 Apr 2020 || 120 || align=left | Disc.: Spacewatch || 
|- id="2004 EE99" bgcolor=#d6d6d6
| 0 ||  || MBA-O || 17.0 || 2.2 km || multiple || 1996–2020 || 22 Apr 2020 || 55 || align=left | Disc.: SpacewatchAdded on 22 July 2020 || 
|- id="2004 EY99" bgcolor=#d6d6d6
| 0 ||  || MBA-O || 17.1 || 2.1 km || multiple || 2004–2020 || 26 Apr 2020 || 72 || align=left | Disc.: SpacewatchAdded on 22 July 2020 || 
|- id="2004 EE100" bgcolor=#d6d6d6
| 0 ||  || MBA-O || 16.91 || 2.3 km || multiple || 2004–2021 || 11 May 2021 || 103 || align=left | Disc.: SpacewatchAdded on 19 October 2020 || 
|- id="2004 EG100" bgcolor=#fefefe
| 0 ||  || MBA-I || 18.32 || data-sort-value="0.64" | 640 m || multiple || 2004–2021 || 31 Oct 2021 || 40 || align=left | Disc.: Spacewatch || 
|- id="2004 EJ100" bgcolor=#d6d6d6
| 0 ||  || MBA-O || 17.0 || 2.2 km || multiple || 2001–2020 || 27 Apr 2020 || 35 || align=left | Disc.: SpacewatchAdded on 22 July 2020 || 
|- id="2004 EO100" bgcolor=#fefefe
| 2 ||  || MBA-I || 18.9 || data-sort-value="0.49" | 490 m || multiple || 2004–2019 || 02 May 2019 || 33 || align=left | Disc.: Spacewatch || 
|- id="2004 EA101" bgcolor=#E9E9E9
| 0 ||  || MBA-M || 18.1 || 1.0 km || multiple || 2004–2018 || 10 Jul 2018 || 39 || align=left | Disc.: Spacewatch || 
|- id="2004 EE101" bgcolor=#E9E9E9
| 0 ||  || MBA-M || 17.1 || 2.1 km || multiple || 1995–2019 || 25 Sep 2019 || 65 || align=left | Disc.: SpacewatchAlt.: 1995 EK5 || 
|- id="2004 ER101" bgcolor=#d6d6d6
| 0 ||  || MBA-O || 16.9 || 2.3 km || multiple || 2004–2020 || 22 Mar 2020 || 52 || align=left | Disc.: SpacewatchAdded on 22 July 2020 || 
|- id="2004 EW101" bgcolor=#fefefe
| 0 ||  || MBA-I || 19.17 || data-sort-value="0.44" | 440 m || multiple || 2004–2021 || 01 Nov 2021 || 41 || align=left | Disc.: Spacewatch || 
|- id="2004 EM102" bgcolor=#d6d6d6
| 0 ||  || MBA-O || 16.51 || 2.8 km || multiple || 2004–2021 || 10 May 2021 || 105 || align=left | Disc.: Spacewatch || 
|- id="2004 ES102" bgcolor=#fefefe
| 0 ||  || MBA-I || 18.2 || data-sort-value="0.68" | 680 m || multiple || 2004–2021 || 18 Jan 2021 || 65 || align=left | Disc.: SpacewatchAlt.: 2011 ED28 || 
|- id="2004 EG103" bgcolor=#d6d6d6
| 0 ||  || MBA-O || 17.3 || 1.9 km || multiple || 2004–2020 || 15 Apr 2020 || 41 || align=left | Disc.: SpacewatchAdded on 22 July 2020Alt.: 2015 HE88 || 
|- id="2004 EC104" bgcolor=#E9E9E9
| 0 ||  || MBA-M || 18.1 || 1.3 km || multiple || 2004–2020 || 11 Dec 2020 || 42 || align=left | Disc.: SpacewatchAdded on 21 August 2021 || 
|- id="2004 EK104" bgcolor=#fefefe
| 0 ||  || MBA-I || 17.9 || data-sort-value="0.78" | 780 m || multiple || 2004–2021 || 17 Jan 2021 || 86 || align=left | Disc.: Spacewatch || 
|- id="2004 EL104" bgcolor=#E9E9E9
| 0 ||  || MBA-M || 17.4 || 1.8 km || multiple || 1995–2021 || 04 Jan 2021 || 81 || align=left | Disc.: SpacewatchAlt.: 2017 BE84 || 
|- id="2004 EP104" bgcolor=#d6d6d6
| 1 ||  || HIL || 16.1 || 3.4 km || multiple || 2004–2020 || 16 May 2020 || 44 || align=left | Disc.: Spacewatch || 
|- id="2004 EU104" bgcolor=#E9E9E9
| 0 ||  || MBA-M || 17.5 || 1.8 km || multiple || 2004–2021 || 06 Jan 2021 || 78 || align=left | Disc.: SpacewatchAlt.: 2014 OH245 || 
|- id="2004 EZ104" bgcolor=#fefefe
| 0 ||  || MBA-I || 19.05 || data-sort-value="0.46" | 460 m || multiple || 2004–2022 || 25 Jan 2022 || 44 || align=left | Disc.: Spacewatch || 
|- id="2004 EB105" bgcolor=#d6d6d6
| 0 ||  || MBA-O || 17.00 || 2.2 km || multiple || 2004–2021 || 12 Sep 2021 || 75 || align=left | Disc.: Spacewatch || 
|- id="2004 EF105" bgcolor=#fefefe
| 0 ||  || MBA-I || 18.7 || data-sort-value="0.54" | 540 m || multiple || 2004–2021 || 01 May 2021 || 61 || align=left | Disc.: SpacewatchAdded on 22 July 2020Alt.: 2014 GL87 || 
|- id="2004 EG105" bgcolor=#d6d6d6
| 0 ||  || MBA-O || 16.6 || 2.7 km || multiple || 2004–2021 || 15 May 2021 || 45 || align=left | Disc.: SpacewatchAdded on 17 June 2021 || 
|- id="2004 EN105" bgcolor=#E9E9E9
| 0 ||  || MBA-M || 17.37 || 1.0 km || multiple || 2004–2021 || 01 May 2021 || 158 || align=left | Disc.: Spacewatch || 
|- id="2004 EP105" bgcolor=#fefefe
| 0 ||  || MBA-I || 17.66 || data-sort-value="0.87" | 870 m || multiple || 2001–2021 || 14 May 2021 || 270 || align=left | Disc.: NEATAlt.: 2002 QF133, 2009 VT72 || 
|- id="2004 EQ105" bgcolor=#E9E9E9
| 0 ||  || MBA-M || 17.63 || 1.3 km || multiple || 2004–2021 || 03 May 2021 || 109 || align=left | Disc.: SpacewatchAlt.: 2014 OM177 || 
|- id="2004 ER105" bgcolor=#fefefe
| 1 ||  || MBA-I || 18.7 || data-sort-value="0.54" | 540 m || multiple || 2002–2017 || 22 Feb 2017 || 36 || align=left | Disc.: SpacewatchAlt.: 2017 DZ41 || 
|- id="2004 EC106" bgcolor=#d6d6d6
| 0 ||  || HIL || 15.79 || 3.9 km || multiple || 2000–2021 || 14 Jul 2021 || 133 || align=left | Disc.: SpacewatchAlt.: 2010 BH99, 2012 FQ29 || 
|- id="2004 ED106" bgcolor=#fefefe
| 1 ||  || MBA-I || 18.9 || data-sort-value="0.49" | 490 m || multiple || 2004–2019 || 05 Nov 2019 || 49 || align=left | Disc.: Spacewatch || 
|- id="2004 EN106" bgcolor=#d6d6d6
| 0 ||  || MBA-O || 16.63 || 2.6 km || multiple || 2004–2021 || 12 May 2021 || 86 || align=left | Disc.: Spacewatch || 
|- id="2004 EY106" bgcolor=#E9E9E9
| 1 ||  || MBA-M || 17.6 || 1.3 km || multiple || 2004–2021 || 04 Jan 2021 || 60 || align=left | Disc.: Spacewatch || 
|- id="2004 EE107" bgcolor=#fefefe
| 0 ||  || MBA-I || 18.6 || data-sort-value="0.57" | 570 m || multiple || 1997–2021 || 03 May 2021 || 52 || align=left | Disc.: SpacewatchAdded on 17 June 2021Alt.: 2021 DC3 || 
|- id="2004 EH107" bgcolor=#fefefe
| 0 ||  || MBA-I || 18.1 || data-sort-value="0.71" | 710 m || multiple || 2000–2020 || 14 Dec 2020 || 106 || align=left | Disc.: Spacewatch || 
|- id="2004 EL107" bgcolor=#fefefe
| 0 ||  || MBA-I || 18.5 || data-sort-value="0.59" | 590 m || multiple || 2004–2020 || 03 Feb 2020 || 87 || align=left | Disc.: SpacewatchAlt.: 2009 WE77 || 
|- id="2004 EQ107" bgcolor=#d6d6d6
| 0 ||  || MBA-O || 17.52 || 1.7 km || multiple || 2004–2021 || 07 Apr 2021 || 44 || align=left | Disc.: SpacewatchAdded on 22 July 2020 || 
|- id="2004 ET107" bgcolor=#d6d6d6
| 0 ||  || MBA-O || 17.40 || 1.8 km || multiple || 2001–2021 || 10 Oct 2021 || 61 || align=left | Disc.: Spacewatch || 
|- id="2004 EV107" bgcolor=#d6d6d6
| 0 ||  || MBA-O || 17.04 || 2.2 km || multiple || 2004–2021 || 11 Jun 2021 || 122 || align=left | Disc.: SpacewatchAlt.: 2009 BC136 || 
|- id="2004 EX107" bgcolor=#E9E9E9
| 0 ||  || MBA-M || 17.76 || 1.2 km || multiple || 2004–2021 || 12 May 2021 || 59 || align=left | Disc.: Spacewatch || 
|- id="2004 EG108" bgcolor=#E9E9E9
| 0 ||  || MBA-M || 17.43 || 1.8 km || multiple || 2004–2022 || 26 Jan 2022 || 51 || align=left | Disc.: SpacewatchAdded on 17 June 2021Alt.: 2013 EA68, 2014 OW243 || 
|- id="2004 ET108" bgcolor=#fefefe
| 1 ||  || MBA-I || 19.21 || data-sort-value="0.43" | 430 m || multiple || 2004–2021 || 07 Oct 2021 || 47 || align=left | Disc.: SpacewatchAdded on 22 July 2020 || 
|- id="2004 EY108" bgcolor=#fefefe
| 0 ||  || MBA-I || 19.1 || data-sort-value="0.45" | 450 m || multiple || 2004–2017 || 09 Dec 2017 || 51 || align=left | Disc.: SpacewatchAlt.: 2006 VO29 || 
|- id="2004 EF109" bgcolor=#E9E9E9
| 0 ||  || MBA-M || 17.6 || 1.3 km || multiple || 2000–2019 || 02 Nov 2019 || 40 || align=left | Disc.: Spacewatch || 
|- id="2004 EJ109" bgcolor=#E9E9E9
| 0 ||  || MBA-M || 17.85 || data-sort-value="0.80" | 800 m || multiple || 2001–2021 || 03 Aug 2021 || 82 || align=left | Disc.: Spacewatch || 
|- id="2004 EK109" bgcolor=#fefefe
| 0 ||  || MBA-I || 18.4 || data-sort-value="0.62" | 620 m || multiple || 2004–2019 || 25 Sep 2019 || 59 || align=left | Disc.: SpacewatchAlt.: 2015 KT137 || 
|- id="2004 EL109" bgcolor=#d6d6d6
| 0 ||  || MBA-O || 17.60 || 1.7 km || multiple || 2004–2020 || 02 Apr 2020 || 37 || align=left | Disc.: SpacewatchAdded on 22 July 2020Alt.: 2015 HO73 || 
|- id="2004 EP109" bgcolor=#E9E9E9
| 0 ||  || MBA-M || 17.91 || 1.1 km || multiple || 2004–2021 || 12 May 2021 || 80 || align=left | Disc.: SpacewatchAlt.: 2012 BL100 || 
|- id="2004 EQ109" bgcolor=#fefefe
| 0 ||  || MBA-I || 18.4 || data-sort-value="0.62" | 620 m || multiple || 2004–2021 || 17 Jan 2021 || 69 || align=left | Disc.: Spacewatch || 
|- id="2004 ET109" bgcolor=#fefefe
| 0 ||  || MBA-I || 18.4 || data-sort-value="0.62" | 620 m || multiple || 2004–2020 || 05 Dec 2020 || 42 || align=left | Disc.: Spacewatch || 
|- id="2004 EX109" bgcolor=#d6d6d6
| 0 ||  || MBA-O || 16.74 || 2.5 km || multiple || 2004–2021 || 16 Apr 2021 || 64 || align=left | Disc.: SpacewatchAlt.: 2007 TN190, 2015 EP50 || 
|- id="2004 EL110" bgcolor=#d6d6d6
| 0 ||  || MBA-O || 16.31 || 3.0 km || multiple || 2001–2021 || 17 Apr 2021 || 172 || align=left | Disc.: SpacewatchAlt.: 2015 FW126 || 
|- id="2004 EW110" bgcolor=#d6d6d6
| 0 ||  || MBA-O || 16.77 || 2.5 km || multiple || 2004–2021 || 14 May 2021 || 102 || align=left | Disc.: SpacewatchAdded on 22 July 2020Alt.: 2013 WU12 || 
|- id="2004 EH111" bgcolor=#fefefe
| 0 ||  || MBA-I || 18.5 || data-sort-value="0.59" | 590 m || multiple || 2004–2021 || 18 Jan 2021 || 82 || align=left | Disc.: SpacewatchAlt.: 2009 WL73, 2011 FQ99 || 
|- id="2004 EJ111" bgcolor=#d6d6d6
| 0 ||  || MBA-O || 16.64 || 2.6 km || multiple || 2004–2021 || 15 Apr 2021 || 88 || align=left | Disc.: SpacewatchAdded on 22 July 2020 || 
|- id="2004 ES112" bgcolor=#fefefe
| 0 ||  || MBA-I || 17.6 || data-sort-value="0.90" | 900 m || multiple || 2004–2021 || 04 Jan 2021 || 113 || align=left | Disc.: SpacewatchAlt.: 2009 UG64 || 
|- id="2004 EC113" bgcolor=#d6d6d6
| 0 ||  || MBA-O || 16.77 || 2.5 km || multiple || 2004–2021 || 13 May 2021 || 62 || align=left | Disc.: SpacewatchAdded on 11 May 2021Alt.: 2021 EY13 || 
|- id="2004 ED114" bgcolor=#E9E9E9
| 0 ||  || MBA-M || 17.4 || 1.4 km || multiple || 2004–2020 || 11 Dec 2020 || 61 || align=left | Disc.: SpacewatchAlt.: 2004 OD15, 2017 BX26 || 
|- id="2004 EM115" bgcolor=#d6d6d6
| 0 ||  || MBA-O || 16.32 || 3.0 km || multiple || 2004–2021 || 08 Jul 2021 || 198 || align=left | Disc.: LINEARAlt.: 2014 WO469 || 
|- id="2004 EJ116" bgcolor=#E9E9E9
| 0 ||  || MBA-M || 17.3 || 1.5 km || multiple || 2004–2021 || 16 Jan 2021 || 161 || align=left | Disc.: NEAT || 
|- id="2004 EL116" bgcolor=#d6d6d6
| 0 ||  || MBA-O || 16.41 || 2.9 km || multiple || 2004–2021 || 08 May 2021 || 131 || align=left | Disc.: Spacewatch || 
|- id="2004 EO116" bgcolor=#d6d6d6
| 0 ||  || MBA-O || 16.85 || 2.4 km || multiple || 2004–2021 || 14 May 2021 || 87 || align=left | Disc.: Spacewatch || 
|- id="2004 EP116" bgcolor=#fefefe
| 0 ||  || MBA-I || 18.8 || data-sort-value="0.52" | 520 m || multiple || 2004–2020 || 20 Oct 2020 || 67 || align=left | Disc.: Spacewatch || 
|- id="2004 ER116" bgcolor=#d6d6d6
| 0 ||  || MBA-O || 17.1 || 2.1 km || multiple || 2004–2020 || 27 Apr 2020 || 65 || align=left | Disc.: Spacewatch || 
|- id="2004 ES116" bgcolor=#fefefe
| 0 ||  || MBA-I || 18.49 || data-sort-value="0.60" | 600 m || multiple || 2004–2022 || 25 Jan 2022 || 71 || align=left | Disc.: Spacewatch || 
|- id="2004 ET116" bgcolor=#fefefe
| 0 ||  || MBA-I || 18.5 || data-sort-value="0.59" | 590 m || multiple || 2004–2019 || 23 Sep 2019 || 56 || align=left | Disc.: Spacewatch || 
|- id="2004 EU116" bgcolor=#fefefe
| 1 ||  || MBA-I || 18.1 || data-sort-value="0.71" | 710 m || multiple || 2004–2020 || 18 Dec 2020 || 62 || align=left | Disc.: LPL/Spacewatch II || 
|- id="2004 EV116" bgcolor=#fefefe
| 0 ||  || MBA-I || 18.24 || data-sort-value="0.67" | 670 m || multiple || 2004–2021 || 08 Nov 2021 || 105 || align=left | Disc.: Spacewatch || 
|- id="2004 EW116" bgcolor=#E9E9E9
| 0 ||  || MBA-M || 17.1 || 2.1 km || multiple || 2004–2020 || 13 Sep 2020 || 57 || align=left | Disc.: Spacewatch || 
|- id="2004 EZ116" bgcolor=#fefefe
| 0 ||  || MBA-I || 18.2 || data-sort-value="0.68" | 680 m || multiple || 2004–2019 || 06 Sep 2019 || 50 || align=left | Disc.: Spacewatch || 
|- id="2004 EA117" bgcolor=#E9E9E9
| 0 ||  || MBA-M || 17.3 || 1.9 km || multiple || 2004–2020 || 14 Dec 2020 || 62 || align=left | Disc.: Spacewatch || 
|- id="2004 EB117" bgcolor=#fefefe
| 0 ||  || MBA-I || 18.4 || data-sort-value="0.62" | 620 m || multiple || 2004–2018 || 10 Jan 2018 || 36 || align=left | Disc.: LPL/Spacewatch II || 
|- id="2004 EC117" bgcolor=#fefefe
| 0 ||  || MBA-I || 18.4 || data-sort-value="0.62" | 620 m || multiple || 2004–2019 || 21 Aug 2019 || 43 || align=left | Disc.: Spacewatch || 
|- id="2004 ED117" bgcolor=#d6d6d6
| 1 ||  || MBA-O || 17.2 || 2.0 km || multiple || 2004–2018 || 13 Jan 2018 || 35 || align=left | Disc.: Spacewatch || 
|- id="2004 EE117" bgcolor=#fefefe
| 0 ||  || MBA-I || 17.5 || data-sort-value="0.94" | 940 m || multiple || 2004–2019 || 27 Oct 2019 || 88 || align=left | Disc.: Spacewatch || 
|- id="2004 EF117" bgcolor=#fefefe
| 0 ||  || MBA-I || 18.44 || data-sort-value="0.61" | 610 m || multiple || 2004–2021 || 28 Sep 2021 || 83 || align=left | Disc.: LPL/Spacewatch II || 
|- id="2004 EH117" bgcolor=#E9E9E9
| 0 ||  || MBA-M || 17.18 || 1.5 km || multiple || 2004–2021 || 03 May 2021 || 75 || align=left | Disc.: Spacewatch || 
|- id="2004 EJ117" bgcolor=#fefefe
| 0 ||  || MBA-I || 17.4 || data-sort-value="0.98" | 980 m || multiple || 2004–2020 || 16 Nov 2020 || 81 || align=left | Disc.: NEAT || 
|- id="2004 EK117" bgcolor=#d6d6d6
| 0 ||  || MBA-O || 17.10 || 2.1 km || multiple || 2004–2021 || 11 Nov 2021 || 90 || align=left | Disc.: Spacewatch || 
|- id="2004 EM117" bgcolor=#E9E9E9
| 0 ||  || MBA-M || 17.68 || 1.2 km || multiple || 2004–2021 || 11 May 2021 || 80 || align=left | Disc.: Spacewatch || 
|- id="2004 EN117" bgcolor=#E9E9E9
| 0 ||  || MBA-M || 17.28 || 1.5 km || multiple || 2004–2021 || 09 Apr 2021 || 86 || align=left | Disc.: NEAT || 
|- id="2004 EQ117" bgcolor=#fefefe
| 0 ||  || MBA-I || 18.0 || data-sort-value="0.75" | 750 m || multiple || 2004–2021 || 18 Jan 2021 || 143 || align=left | Disc.: Spacewatch || 
|- id="2004 ER117" bgcolor=#fefefe
| 0 ||  || MBA-I || 18.6 || data-sort-value="0.57" | 570 m || multiple || 2004–2020 || 10 Dec 2020 || 87 || align=left | Disc.: Spacewatch || 
|- id="2004 ES117" bgcolor=#fefefe
| 0 ||  || MBA-I || 19.17 || data-sort-value="0.44" | 440 m || multiple || 2004–2022 || 27 Jan 2022 || 32 || align=left | Disc.: Spacewatch || 
|- id="2004 ET117" bgcolor=#d6d6d6
| 0 ||  || MBA-O || 16.5 || 2.8 km || multiple || 2004–2018 || 02 Nov 2018 || 38 || align=left | Disc.: Spacewatch || 
|- id="2004 EU117" bgcolor=#d6d6d6
| 0 ||  || MBA-O || 16.73 || 2.5 km || multiple || 2004–2021 || 19 May 2021 || 103 || align=left | Disc.: NEAT || 
|- id="2004 EW117" bgcolor=#E9E9E9
| 0 ||  || MBA-M || 18.19 || data-sort-value="0.97" | 970 m || multiple || 2004–2021 || 15 Apr 2021 || 60 || align=left | Disc.: Spacewatch || 
|- id="2004 EX117" bgcolor=#fefefe
| 0 ||  || HUN || 18.94 || data-sort-value="0.48" | 480 m || multiple || 2004–2021 || 02 Oct 2021 || 55 || align=left | Disc.: LPL/Spacewatch II || 
|- id="2004 EY117" bgcolor=#fefefe
| 0 ||  || HUN || 18.7 || data-sort-value="0.54" | 540 m || multiple || 2004–2020 || 18 Mar 2020 || 55 || align=left | Disc.: SpacewatchAdded on 22 July 2020 || 
|- id="2004 EZ117" bgcolor=#E9E9E9
| 0 ||  || MBA-M || 18.34 || data-sort-value="0.64" | 640 m || multiple || 2004–2021 || 08 Sep 2021 || 52 || align=left | Disc.: SpacewatchAdded on 22 July 2020 || 
|- id="2004 EC118" bgcolor=#d6d6d6
| 0 ||  || MBA-O || 16.9 || 2.3 km || multiple || 2004–2020 || 27 Apr 2020 || 43 || align=left | Disc.: SpacewatchAdded on 11 May 2021 || 
|}
back to top

References 
 

Lists of unnumbered minor planets